= Aircraft carrier =

Warship that serves as a seagoing airbase

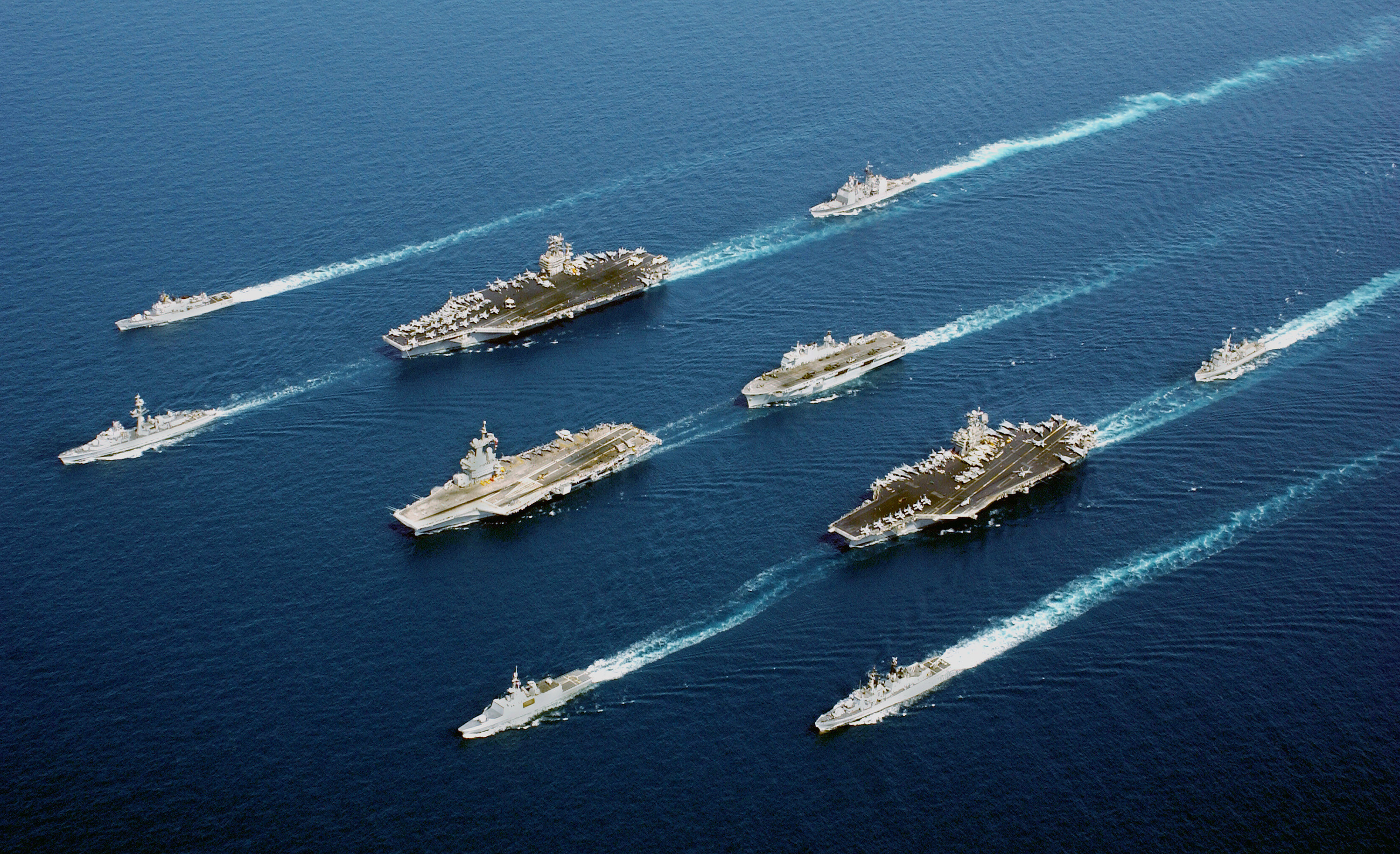
Three steam catapult equipped aircraft carriers of various types—USS John C. Stennis, Charles de Gaulle (French Navy), and USS John F. Kennedy—along with the helicopter carrier HMS Ocean and escort vessels, 2002

A selection of aircraft carriers, sorted by length

An aircraft carrier is a warship designed to carry, launch, recover and support aircraft at sea, equipped with a full-length flight deck and hangar facilities that allow it to serve as a mobile, seagoing airbase. Typically it is the capital ship of a fleet (known as a carrier battle group), as it allows a naval force to project seaborne air power far from national territory without depending on local airfields for the staging of aircraft operations. Since their inception in the early 20th century, aircraft carriers have evolved from wooden vessels used to deploy individual tethered reconnaissance balloons, to nuclear-powered supercarriers that carry dozens of fighters, strike aircraft, military helicopters, AEW&Cs and other types of aircraft such as UCAVs. While heavier fixed-wing aircraft such as airlifters, gunships and bombers have been launched from aircraft carriers, these aircraft do not often land on a carrier due to flight deck limitations.

The aircraft carrier, along with its onboard aircraft and defensive ancillary weapons, is the largest weapon system ever created. Due to their tactical prowess, mobility, autonomy and the variety of operational means, aircraft carriers are often the centerpiece of modern naval warfare, and have significant diplomatic influence in deterrence, command of the sea and air supremacy. Since the Second World War, the aircraft carrier has replaced the battleship in the role of flagship of a fleet, and largely transformed naval battles from gunfire to beyond-visual-range air strikes. In addition to tactical aptitudes, it has great strategic advantages in that, by sailing in international waters, it does not need to interfere with any territorial sovereignty and thus does not risk diplomatic complications or conflict escalation due to trespassing, and obviates the need for land use authorizations from third-party countries, reduces the times and transit logistics of aircraft and therefore significantly increases the time of availability on the combat zone.

Modern navies use several variants of the aircraft carrier which are sometimes categorized as sub-types of aircraft carriers and sometimes as distinct types of aviation-capable ships. Aircraft carriers may be classified according to the type of aircraft they carry and their operational assignments. Admiral Sir Mark Stanhope, RN, former First Sea Lord (head) of the Royal Navy, has said, "To put it simply, countries that aspire to strategic international influence have aircraft carriers." Henry Kissinger, while United States Secretary of State, also said: "An aircraft carrier is 100,000 tons of diplomacy."

As of November 2026, there are 50 active aircraft carriers in the world operated by fifteen navies. The United States has 11 large nuclear-powered CATOBAR fleet carriers – each carrying around 80 fighters – the largest in the world, which, in 2015, had a total combined deck space over twice that of all other nations combined.

== Types of carriers ==
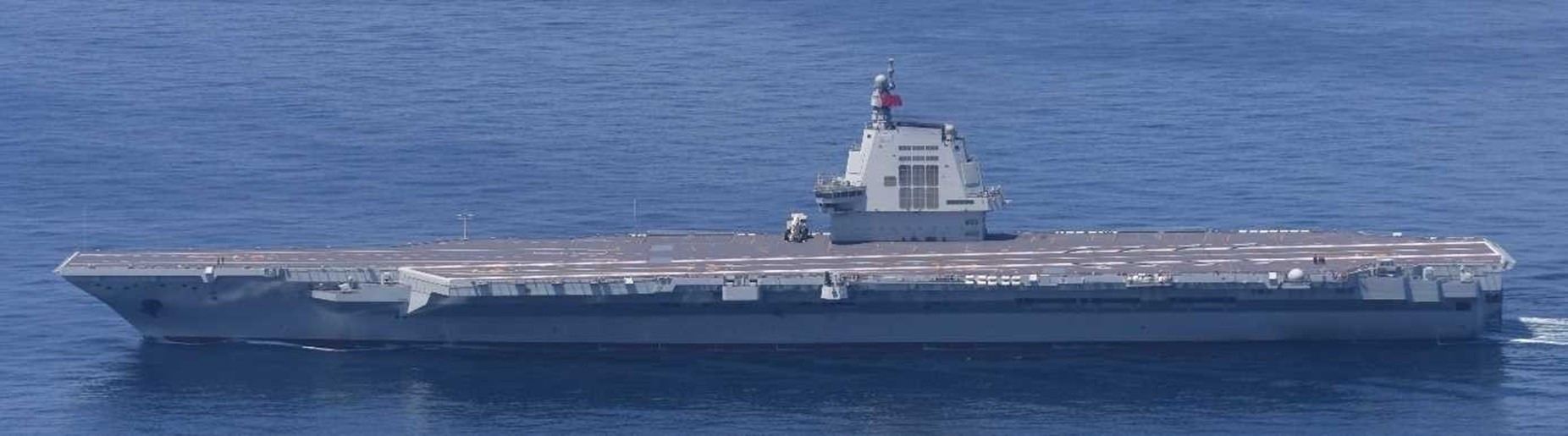
Chinese aircraft carrier Fujian is the first aircraft carrier in the world to launch a fifth-generation fighter using the electromagnetic catapult system

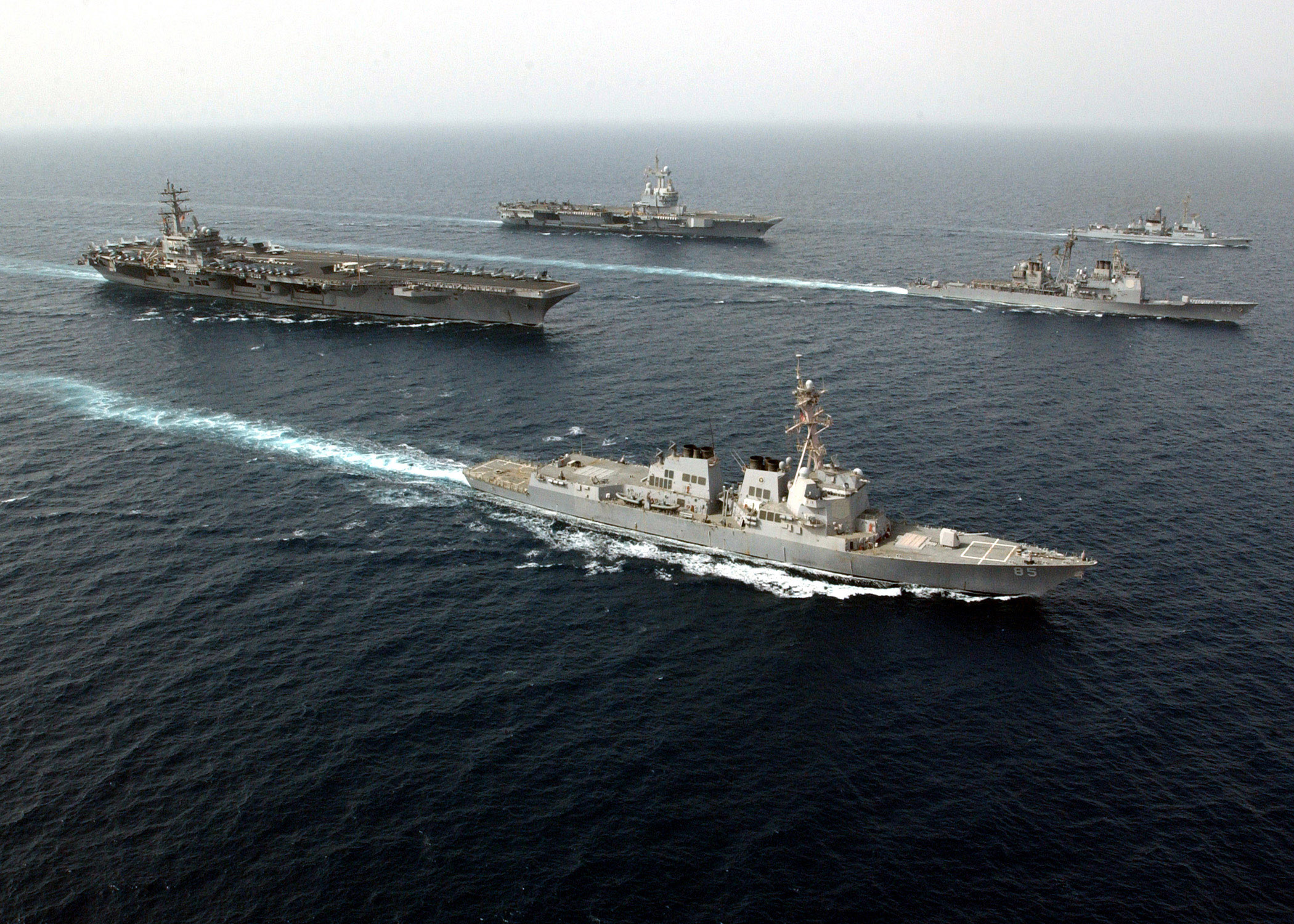
French aircraft carrier Charles de Gaulle (rear) and US Navy carrier USS Ronald Reagan conducting joint operations in the Persian Gulf, each with the CATOBAR configuration

=== General features ===
- Speed is a crucial attribute for aircraft carriers, as they need to be able to be deployed quickly anywhere in the world and have to be fast enough to evade detection and targeting from enemy forces. A high speed also increases the "wind over the deck", boosting the lift available for fixed-wing aircraft to carry fuel and ammunition. To evade nuclear submarines, the carriers should have a speed of more than 30 knots (35 mph; 56 km/h).
- Aircraft carriers are among the largest types of warships due to their need for ample deck space.
- An aircraft carrier must be able to perform increasingly diverse mission sets. Diplomacy, power projection, quick crisis response force, land attack from the sea, sea base for helicopter and amphibious assault forces, anti-surface warfare (ASUW), defensive counter air (DCA), and humanitarian aid & disaster relief (HADR) are some of the missions the aircraft carrier is expected to accomplish. Traditionally an aircraft carrier is supposed to be one ship that can perform at least power projection and sea control missions.
- An aircraft carrier must be able to efficiently operate an air combat group. This means it should handle fixed-wing jets as well as helicopters. This includes ships designed to support operations of short-takeoff/vertical-landing (STOVL) jets.

=== Basic types ===
- Aircraft cruiser
- Amphibious assault ship and sub-types
- Anti-submarine warfare carrier
- Balloon carrier and balloon tenders
- Escort carrier
- Fleet carrier
- Flight deck cruiser
- Helicopter carrier
- Light aircraft carrier
- Seaplane tender and seaplane carriers
- Utility carrier: This type was mainly used in the US Navy, in the decade after World War 2 to ferry aircraft.

Some of the types listed here are not strictly defined as aircraft carriers by some sources.

=== By role ===
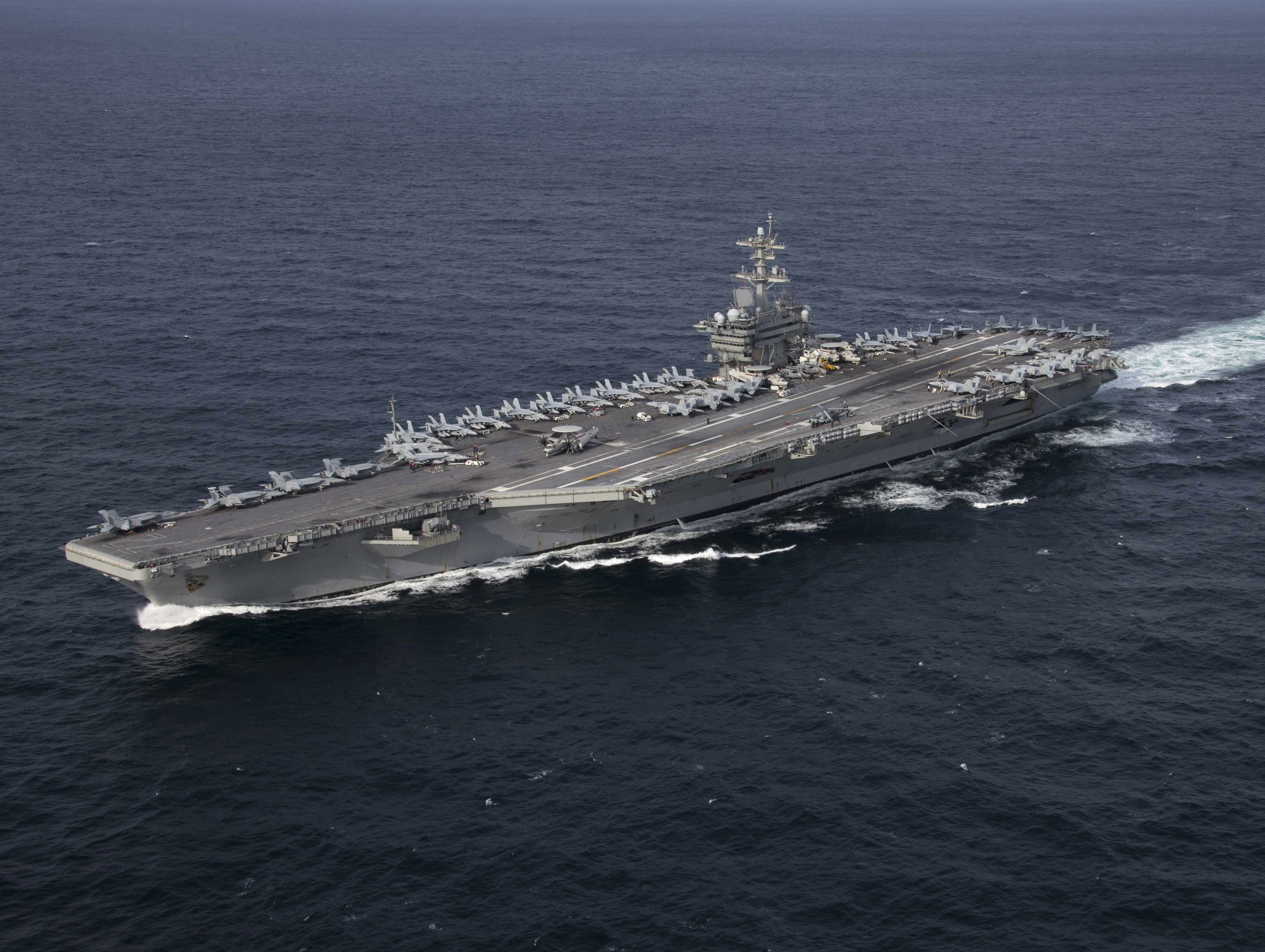
USS Abraham Lincoln (CVN-72), a United States Navy fleet carrier, also often referred to as a supercarrier, crossing the Atlantic in 2019

A fleet carrier is intended to operate with the main fleet and usually provides an offensive capability. These are the largest carriers capable of fast speeds. By comparison, escort carriers were developed to provide defense for convoys of ships. They were smaller and slower with lower numbers of aircraft carried. Most were built from mercantile hulls or, in the case of merchant aircraft carriers, were bulk cargo ships with a flight deck added on top. Light aircraft carriers were fast enough to operate with the main fleet but of smaller size with reduced aircraft capacity.

The Soviet aircraft carrier Admiral Kusnetsov was termed a "heavy aircraft-carrying cruiser". This was primarily a legal construct to avoid the limitations of the Montreux Convention preventing 'aircraft carriers' transiting the Turkish Straits between the Soviet Black Sea bases and the Mediterranean Sea. These ships, while sized in the range of large fleet carriers, were designed to deploy alone or with escorts. In addition to supporting fighter aircraft and helicopters, they provide both strong defensive weaponry and heavy offensive missiles equivalent to a guided-missile cruiser.

=== By configuration ===
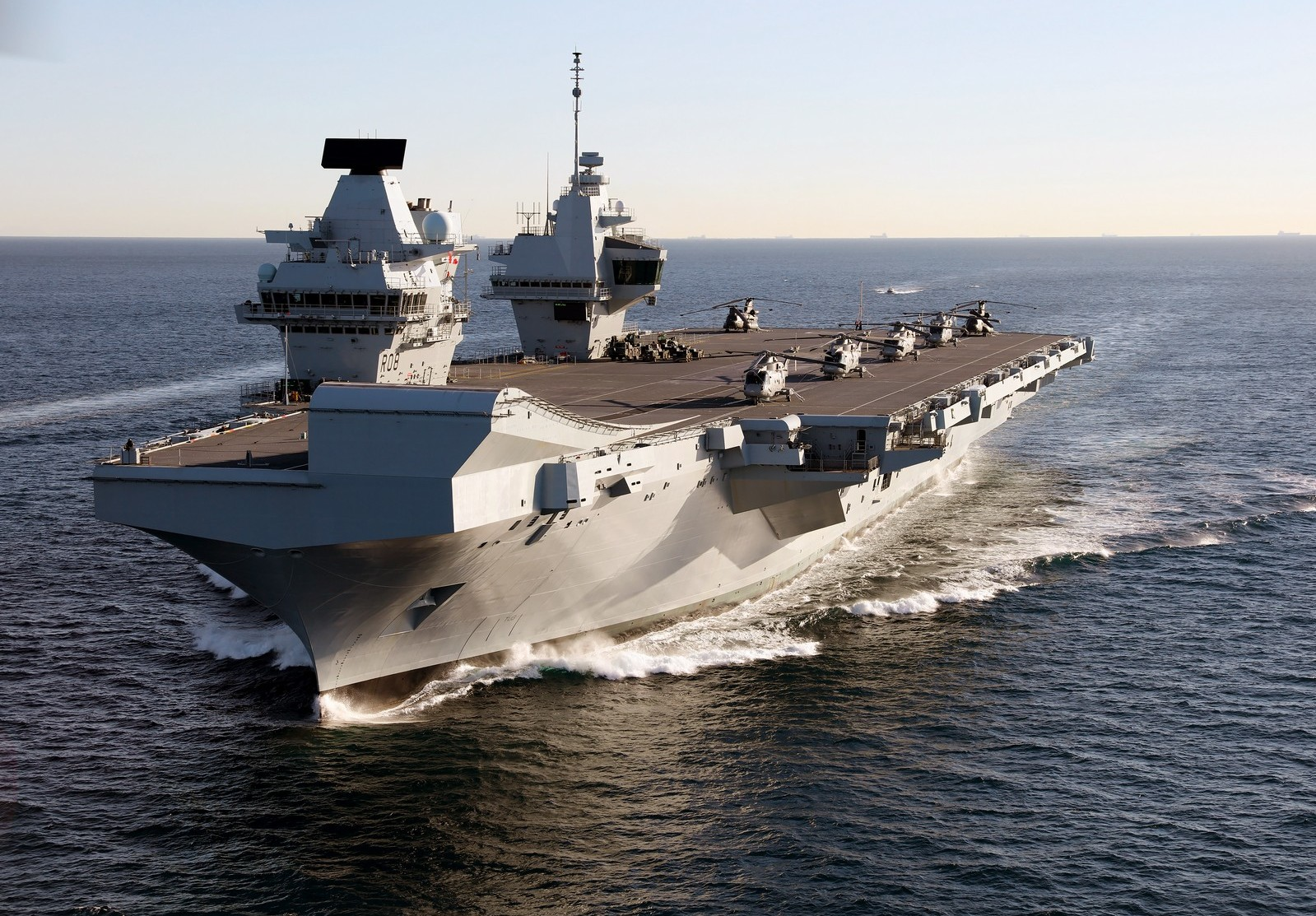
Aircraft carriers in the STOVL configuration are in service with Italy, Spain, Thailand and the United Kingdom.

Aircraft carriers today are usually divided into the following four categories based on the way that aircraft take off and land:

- Catapult-assisted take-off barrier-arrested recovery (CATOBAR): these carriers generally carry the largest, heaviest, and most heavily armed aircraft, although smaller CATOBAR carriers may have other limitations (weight capacity of aircraft elevator, etc.). All CATOBAR carriers in service today are nuclear-powered except the Fujian. Thirteen are in service: ten Nimitz class and one Gerald R. Ford-class carrier in the United States, Fujian in China, and Charles de Gaulle in France.
- Short take-off barrier-arrested recovery (STOBAR): these carriers are generally limited to carrying lighter fixed-wing aircraft with more limited payloads. STOBAR carrier air wings, such as the Sukhoi Su-33 and future Mikoyan MiG-29K wings of Admiral Kuznetsov are often geared primarily towards air superiority and fleet defense roles rather than strike/power projection tasks, which require heavier payloads (bombs and air-to-ground missiles). Five are in service: two in China, two in India, and one in Russia.
- Short take-off vertical-landing (STOVL): limited to carrying STOVL aircraft. STOVL aircraft, such as the Harrier family and Yakovlev Yak-38 generally have limited payloads, lower performance, and high fuel consumption when compared with conventional fixed-wing aircraft. However, a new generation of STOVL aircraft, currently consisting of the Lockheed Martin F-35B Lightning II, has much improved performance. Fourteen are in service; nine STOVL amphibious assault ships in the US; the UK has two Queen Elizabeth Class carriers, and Italy has one carrier and one amphibious assault ship, with one STOVL amphibious assault ship in Spain.
- Helicopter carrier: These carriers have a similar appearance to other aircraft carriers but operate only helicopters – those that mainly operate helicopters but can also operate fixed-wing aircraft are known as STOVL carriers (see above). Seventeen are in service: four in Japan; three in France; two each in Australia, China, Egypt and South Korea; and one each in Brazil and Thailand. In the past, some conventional carriers were converted and these were called "commando carriers" by the Royal Navy. Some helicopter carriers, but not all, are classified as amphibious assault ships, tasked with landing and supporting ground forces on enemy territory.

=== By size ===
- Fleet carrier
- Light aircraft carrier
- Escort carrier

==== Supercarrier ====
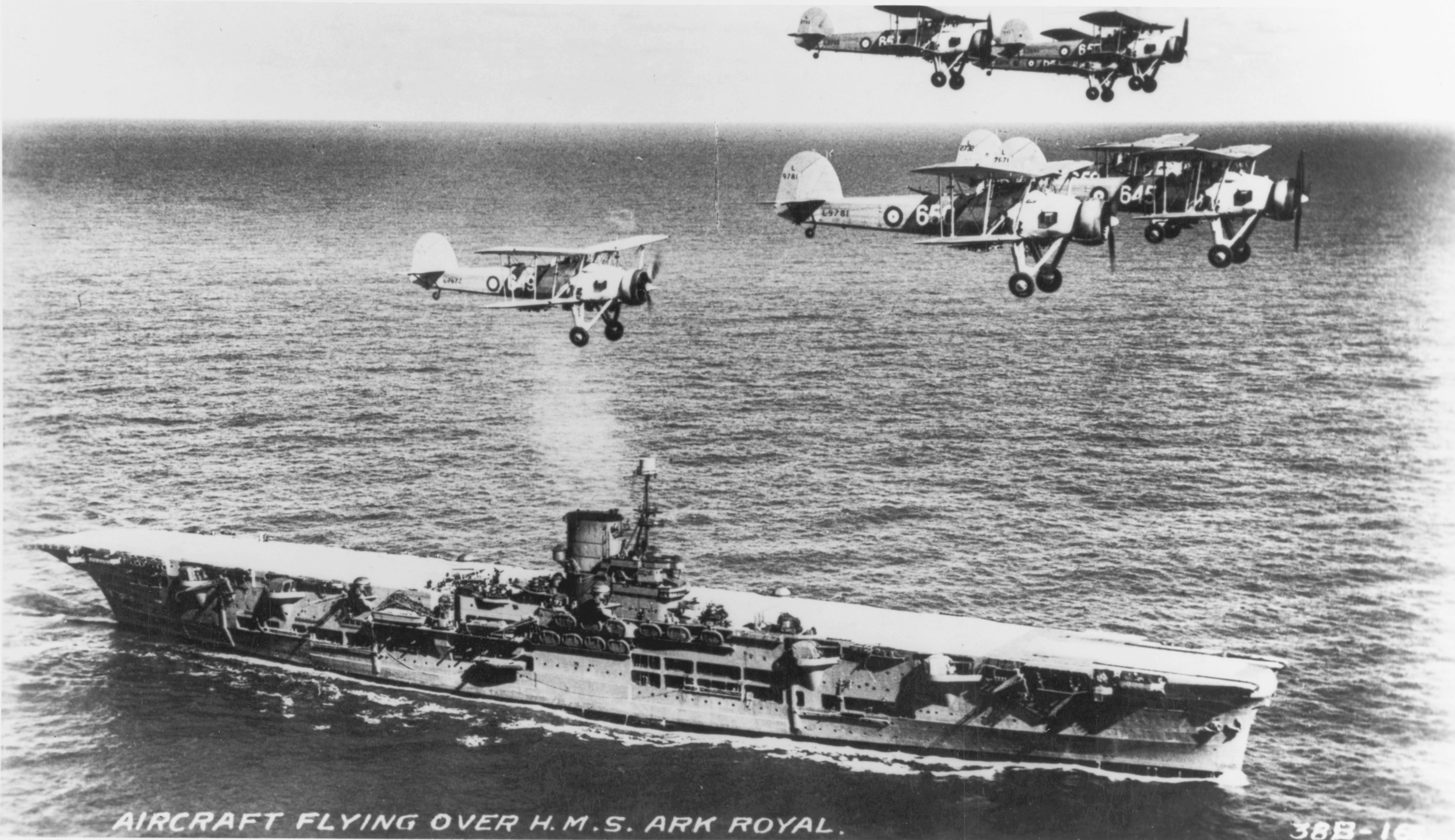
The Royal Navy's HMS Ark Royal in 1939, with Swordfish biplane bombers passing overhead. The British aircraft carrier was involved in the crippling of the German battleship Bismarck in May 1941.

The appellation "supercarrier" is not an official designation with any national navy, but a term used predominantly by the media and typically when reporting on larger and more advanced carrier types. It is also used when comparing carriers of various sizes and capabilities, both current and past. It was first used by The New York Times in 1938, in an article about the Royal Navy's HMS Ark Royal, that had a length of 800 feet (244 m), a displacement of 22,000 tons and was designed to carry 72 aircraft. Since then, aircraft carriers have consistently grown in size, both in length and displacement, as well as improved capabilities; in defense, sensors, electronic warfare, propulsion, range, launch and recovery systems, number and types of aircraft carried and number of sorties flown per day.

The first aircraft carrier over 80,000 tonnes full-load displacement was the USS Forrestal launched in 1954. In total, the US Navy has had 5 different classes of aircraft carrier of this size definition, the Forrestal-class, Kitty Hawk-class, the Enterprise-class, the Nimitz-class and Gerald R. Ford-class, two of which were conventional steam-powered and three nuclear-powered. USS Enterprise, launched in 1960, was the first carrier over 90,000 tonnes full load displacement and Nimitz, launched in 1972, was the first over 100,000 tonnes displacement. A total of 22 supercarriers have been launched by the US Navy since 1954, with 11 currently in service.

Both China (Type 003) and the United Kingdom (Queen Elizabeth class) have carriers in service with displacements from 80,000 to 85,000 tonnes and lengths from 280 to 320 meters (920 to 1,050 ft) which are described as "supercarriers". France is also developing a new aircraft carrier (PANG) which is to have a full load displacement of 80,000 tonnes and will be considered a supercarrier. The largest supercarrier in service as of 2024 is the US Navy's USS Gerald R. Ford, with full load displacement of around 100,000 tons, length of 337 meters (1,106 ft) and capabilities that exceed those of any other class.

===== Ultracarrier =====
A US Navy proposal for an aircraft carrier concept with a length of 1,310 feet and a displacement of 500,000 tons full load at a cost of $828 million in 1976 dollars.

Project Habakkuk could be considered an early proposal for an "ultracarrier".

=== Hull type identification symbols ===
Several systems of identification symbol for aircraft carriers and related types of ship have been used. These include the pennant numbers used by the Royal Navy, Commonwealth countries, and Europe, along with the hull classification symbols used by the US and Canada.

US hull classification symbols for aircraft carriers and related ship types
Symbol	Designation
CV	Generic aircraft carrier
CVA	Attack carrier (up to 1975)
CVB	Large aircraft carrier (retired 1952)
CVAN	Nuclear-powered attack carrier
CVE	Escort carrier
CVHA	Aircraft carrier, Helicopter Assault (retired)
CVHE	Aircraft carrier, Helicopter, Escort (retired)
CVV	Aircraft Carrier (Medium) (proposed)
CVL	Light aircraft carrier
CVN	Nuclear-powered aircraft carrier
CVS	Anti-submarine warfare carrier
CVT	Training Aircraft Carrier
CVU	Utility carrier (retired)
LHA	Landing helicopter assault, a type of amphibious assault ship
LHD	Landing helicopter dock, a type of amphibious assault ship
LPH	Landing platform helicopter, a type of amphibious assault ship

== History ==
=== Origins ===
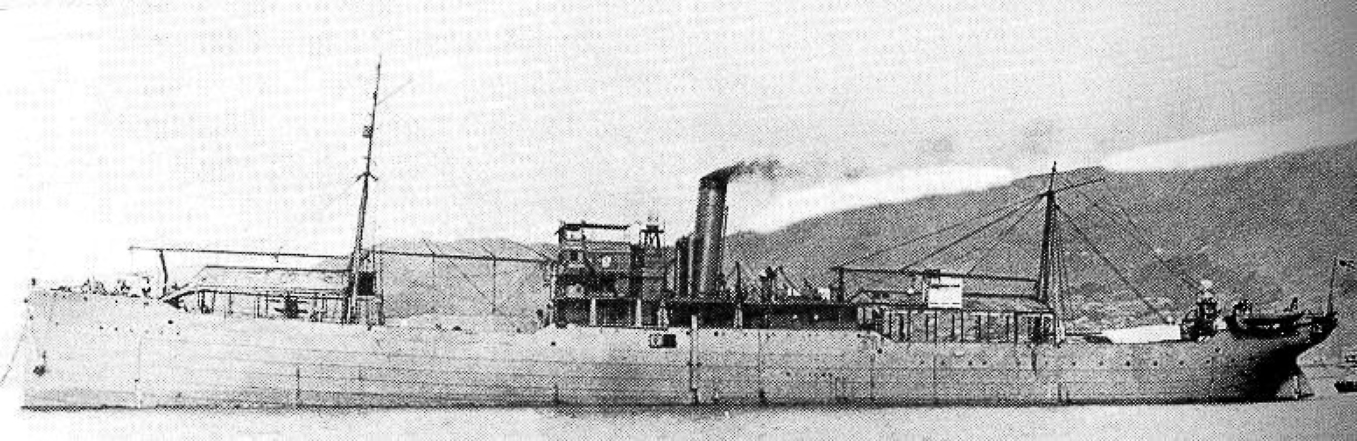
The Wakamiya conducted the world's first naval-launched air raids in 1914.

HMS Argus, the first ship with a full-length flight deck.

The 1903 advent of the heavier-than-air fixed-wing airplane with the Wright brothers' first flight at Kitty Hawk, North Carolina, was followed on 14 November 1910, by Eugene Burton Ely's first experimental take-off of a Curtiss Pusher airplane from the deck of a United States Navy ship, the cruiser USS Birmingham anchored off Norfolk Navy Base in Virginia. Two months later, on 18 January 1911, Ely landed his Curtiss Pusher airplane on a platform on the armored cruiser USS Pennsylvania anchored in San Francisco Bay. On 9 May 1912, the first take off of an airplane from a ship while underway was made by Commander Charles Samson flying a Short Improved S.27 biplane "S.38" of the Royal Naval Air Service (RNAS) from the deck of the Royal Navy's pre-dreadnought battleship HMS Hibernia, thus providing the first practical demonstration of the aircraft carrier for naval operations at sea. Seaplane tender support ships came next, with the French Foudre of 1911.

Early in World War I, the Imperial Japanese Navy ship Wakamiya conducted the world's first carrier-launched air raid: on 6 September 1914, the Wakamiya used its crane to lower Farman seaplanes into the water. The Wakamiya attacked the Austro-Hungarian cruiser SMS Kaiserin Elisabeth and the Imperial German gunboat Jaguar in Jiaozhou Bay off Qingdao; neither was hit. The first attack using an air-launched torpedo occurred on 2 August, when a torpedo was fired by Flight Commander Charles Edmonds from a Short Type 184 seaplane, launched from the seaplane carrier HMS Ben-my-Chree.

The first carrier-launched airstrike was the Tondern raid in July 1918. Seven Sopwith Camels were launched from the battlecruiser HMS Furious, which had been completed as a carrier by replacing her planned forward turret with a flight deck and hangar prior to commissioning. The Camels attacked and damaged the German airbase at Tondern, Germany (modern day Tønder, Denmark), and destroyed two zeppelin airships.

The first landing of an airplane on a moving ship was by Squadron Commander Edwin Harris Dunning, when he landed his Sopwith Pup on HMS Furious in Scapa Flow, Orkney, on 2 August 1917. Landing on the forward flight deck required the pilot to approach round the ship's superstructure, a difficult and dangerous manoeuver, and Dunning was later killed when his airplane was thrown overboard while attempting another landing on Furious. HMS Furious was modified again when her rear turret was removed and another flight deck added over a second hangar for landing aircraft over the stern. Her funnel and superstructure remained intact, however, and turbulence from the funnel and superstructure was severe enough that only three landing attempts were successful before further attempts were forbidden. This experience prompted the development of vessels with a flush deck and produced the first large fleet ships. In 1918, HMS Argus became the world's first carrier capable of launching and recovering naval aircraft.

As a result of the Washington Naval Treaty of 1922, which limited the construction of new heavy surface combat ships, most early aircraft carriers were conversions of ships that were laid down (or had served) as different ship types: cargo ships, cruisers, battlecruisers, or battleships. These conversions gave rise to the USS Langley in 1922, the US Lexington-class aircraft carriers (1927), Japanese Akagi and Kaga, and British Courageous class (of which Furious was one). Specialist carrier evolution was well underway, with several navies ordering and building warships that were purposefully designed to function as aircraft carriers by the mid-1920s. This resulted in the commissioning of ships such as the Japanese Hōshō (1922), HMS Hermes (1924, although laid down in 1918 before Hōshō), and Béarn (1927). During World War II, these ships would become known as fleet carriers.

=== World War II ===
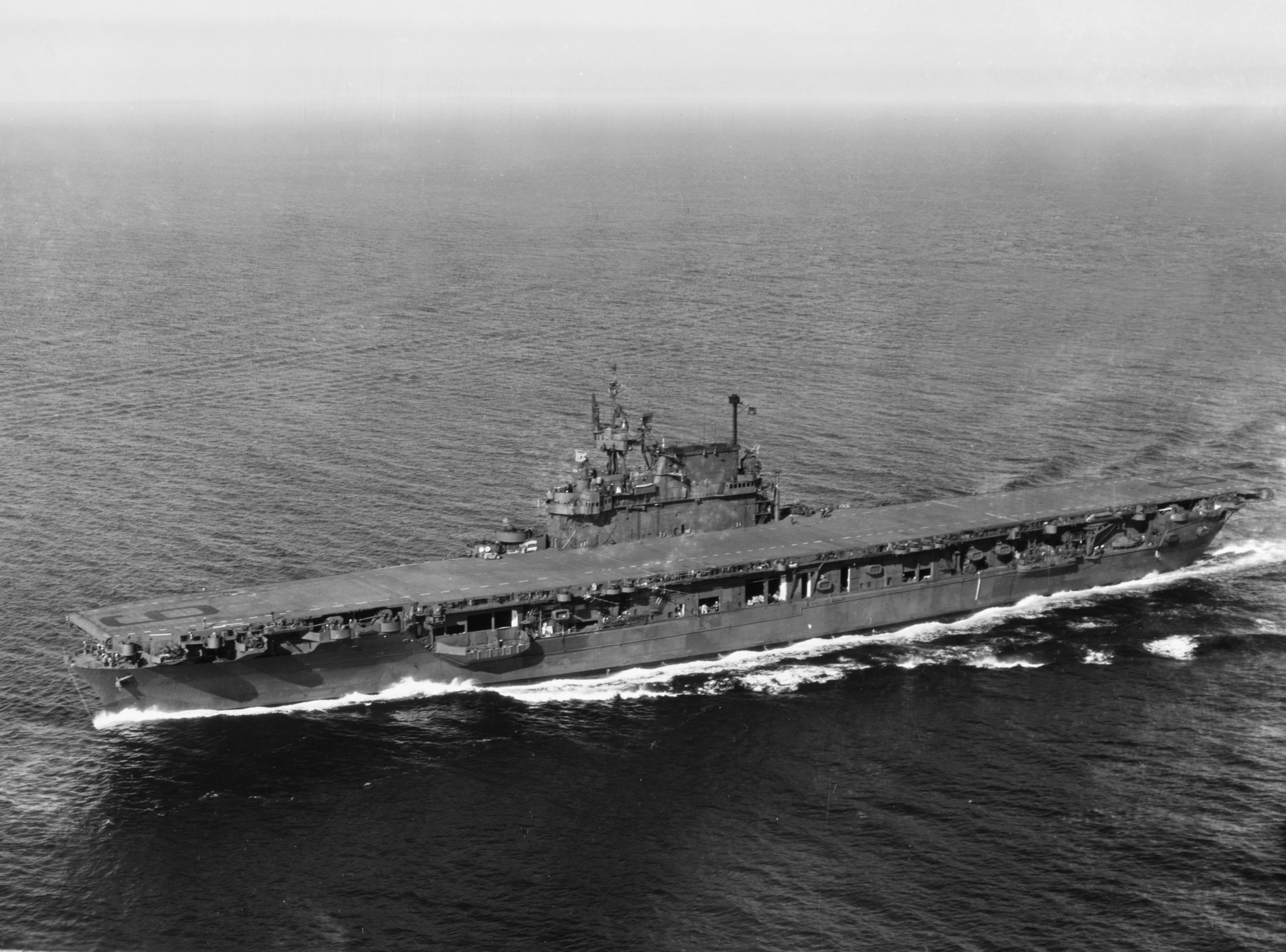
USS Enterprise, the most decorated US warship of World War II

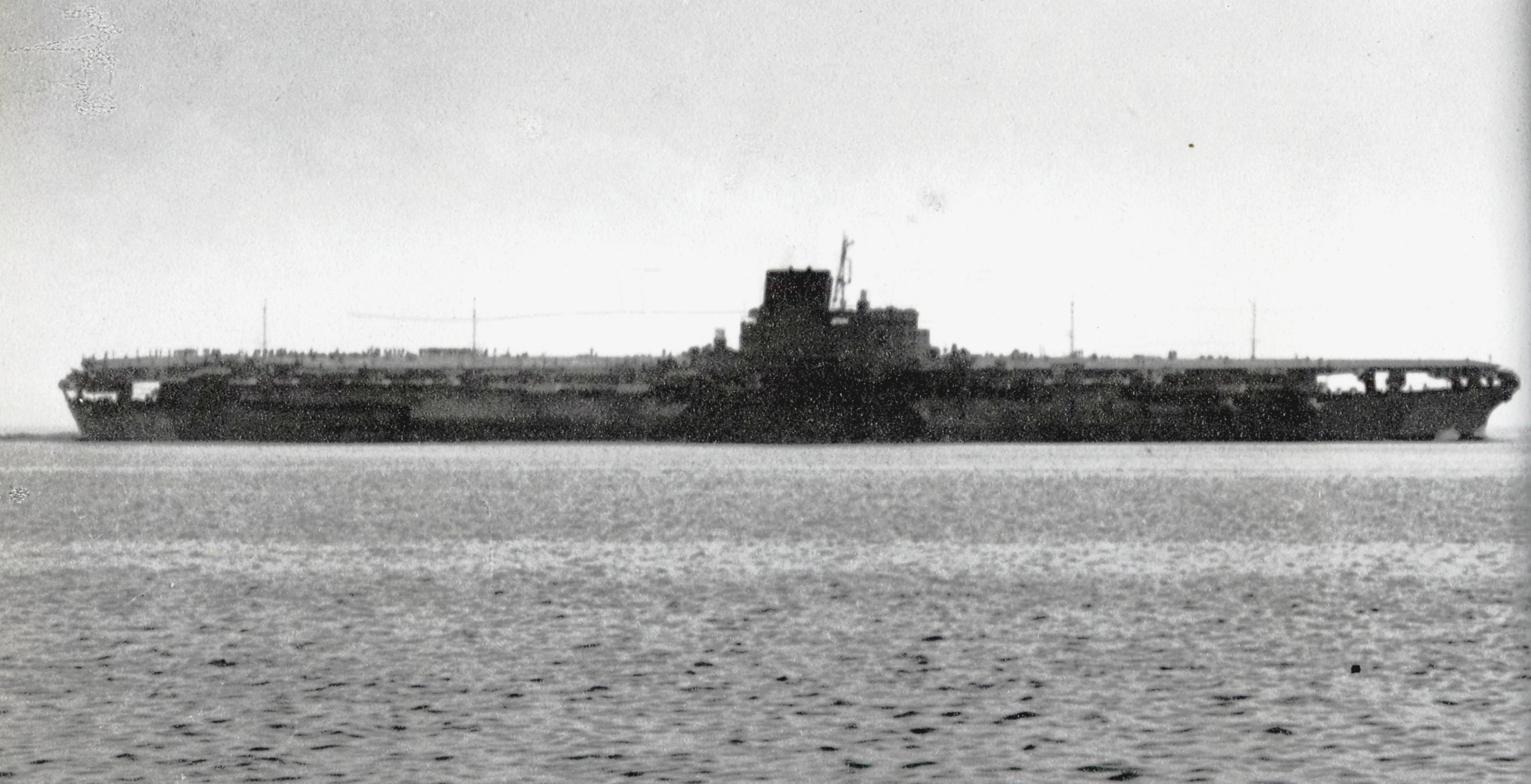
The Japanese carrier Shinano was built on a battleship hull to carry spare aircraft and ordnance in support of other carriers. En route to complete fitting out it was sunk by an American submarine.

The aircraft carrier dramatically changed naval warfare in World War II, because air power was becoming a significant factor in warfare. The advent of aircraft as focal weapons was driven by the superior range, flexibility, and effectiveness of carrier-launched aircraft. They had greater range and precision than naval guns, making them highly effective. The versatility of the carrier was demonstrated in November 1940, when HMS Illustrious launched a long-range strike on the Italian fleet at their base in Taranto, signaling the beginning of the effective and highly mobile aircraft strikes. This operation in the shallow water harbor incapacitated three of the six anchored battleships at a cost of two torpedo bombers.

World War II in the Pacific Ocean involved clashes between aircraft carrier fleets. The Japanese surprise attack on the American Pacific fleet at Pearl Harbor naval and air bases on Sunday, 7 December 1941, was a clear illustration of the power projection capability afforded by a large force of modern carriers. Concentrating six carriers in a single unit turned naval history about, as no other nation had fielded anything comparable. In the "Doolittle Raid", on 18 April 1942, the US Navy carrier USS Hornet sailed to within 650 nautical miles (1,200 km) of Japan and launched 16 B-25 Mitchell medium bombers from her deck in a demonstrative retaliatory strike on the mainland, including the capital, Tokyo. However, the vulnerability of carriers compared to traditional capital ships was illustrated by the sinking of HMS Glorious by German battleships during the Norwegian campaign in 1940.

This new-found importance of naval aviation prompted nations to create a number of carriers, in efforts to provide air superiority cover for every major fleet to ward off enemy aircraft. This extensive usage led to the development and construction of 'light' carriers. Escort aircraft carriers, such as USS Bogue, were sometimes purpose-built but most were converted from merchant ships as a stop-gap measure to provide anti-submarine air support for convoys and amphibious invasions. Following this concept, light aircraft carriers built by the US, such as USS Independence (commissioned in 1943), represented a larger, more "militarized" version of the escort carrier. Although with similar complement to escort carriers, they had the advantage of speed from their converted cruiser hulls. The UK 1942 Design Light Fleet Carrier was designed for building quickly by civilian shipyards and with an expected service life of about 3 years. They served the Royal Navy during the war, and the hull design was chosen for nearly all aircraft carrier equipped navies after the war, until the 1980s. Emergencies also spurred the creation or conversion of highly unconventional aircraft carriers. CAM ships were cargo-carrying merchant ships that could launch (but not retrieve) a single fighter aircraft from a catapult to defend the convoy from long range land-based German aircraft. Noteworthy converted carriers were also USS Sable (IX-81) and USS Wolverine (IX-64) that both operated on the Great Lakes for training duties and were converted from paddle steamers, making them the only aircraft carriers with this type of propulsion.

=== Postwar era ===
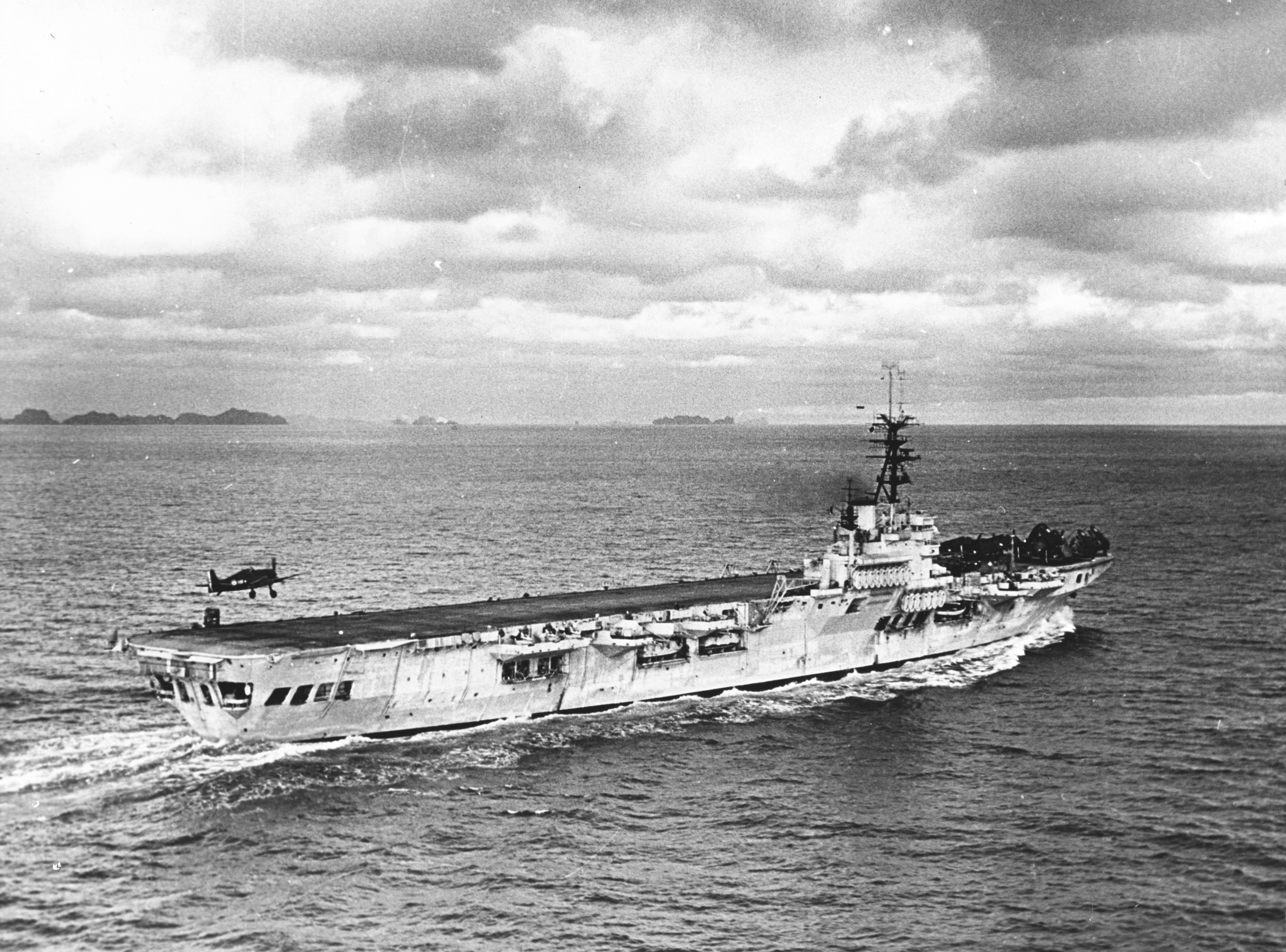
An F6F-5 landing on the French Arromanches in the Tonkin Gulf, 1953

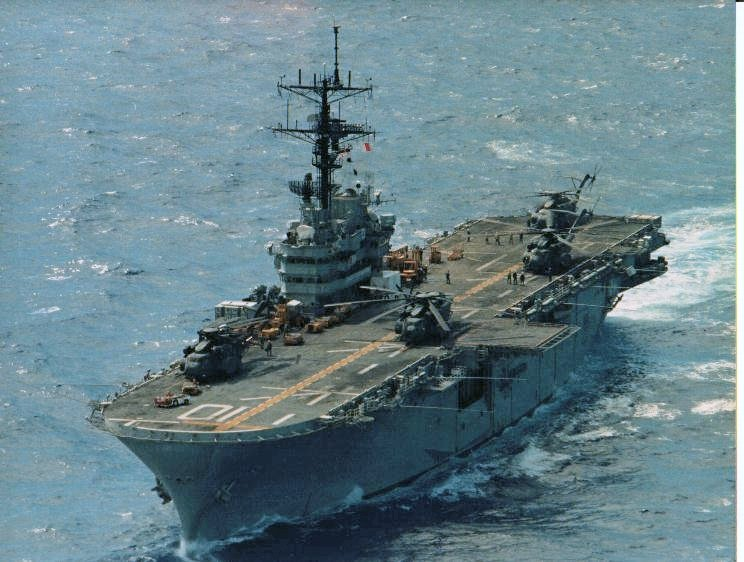
USS Tripoli, a U.S. Navy Iwo Jima-class helicopter carrier

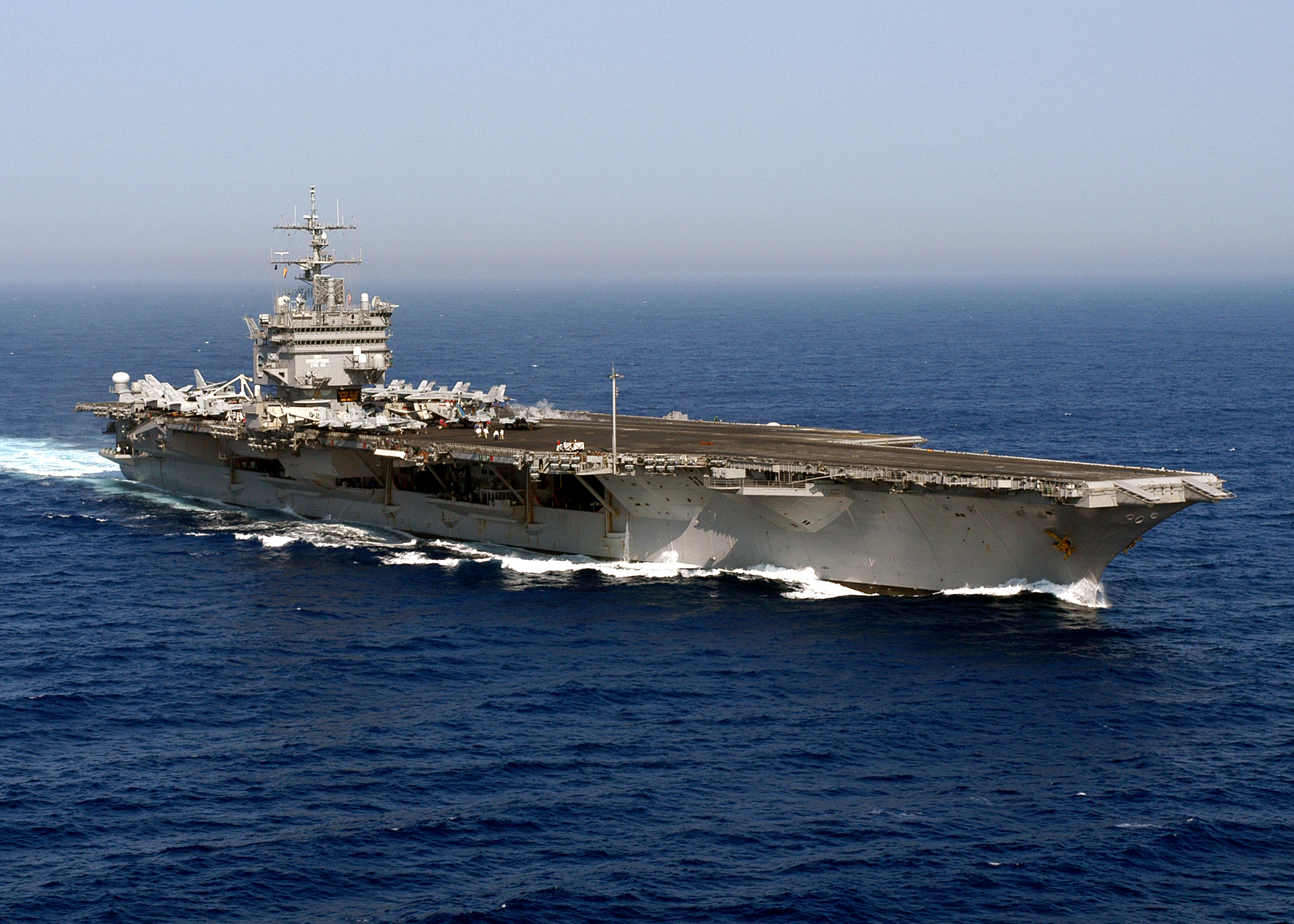
USS Enterprise (CVN-65), the world's first nuclear-powered carrier, commissioned in 1961

Before World War II, international naval treaties of 1922, 1930, and 1936 limited the size of capital ships, including carriers. Since World War II, aircraft carrier designs have increased in size to accommodate a steady increase in aircraft size. The large, modern Nimitz class of US Navy carriers has a displacement nearly four times that of the World War II–era USS Enterprise, yet its complement of aircraft is roughly the same—a consequence of the steadily increasing size and weight of individual military aircraft over the years. Today's aircraft carriers are so expensive that some nations which operate them risk significant economic and military impact if a carrier is lost.

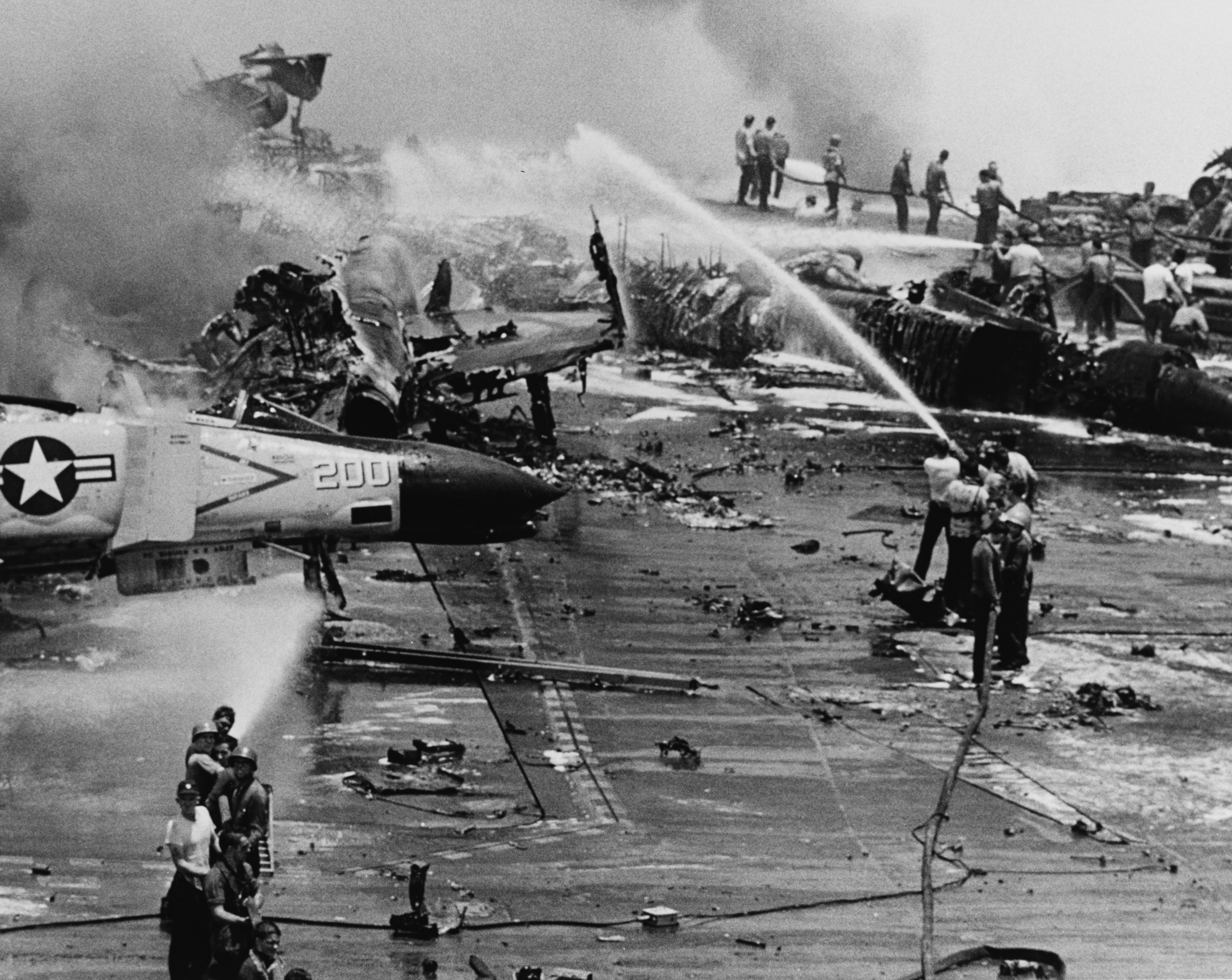
Fighting the fire on board USS Forrestal, 1967

Some changes were made after 1945 in carriers:

- The angled flight deck was invented by Royal Navy Captain (later Rear Admiral) Dennis Cambell, as naval aviation jets' higher speeds required carriers be modified to fit their needs. Additionally, the angled flight deck allows for simultaneous launch and recovery.
- Jet blast deflectors became necessary to protect aircraft and handlers from jet blast. The first US Navy carriers to be fitted with them were the wooden-decked Essex-class aircraft carriers which were adapted to operate jets in the late 1940s. Later versions had to be water-cooled because of increasing engine power.
- Optical landing systems were developed to facilitate the very precise landing angles required by jet aircraft, which have a faster landing speed giving the pilot little time to correct misalignments, or mistakes. The first system was fitted to HMS Illustrious in 1952.
- Aircraft carrier designs have increased in size to accommodate continuous increase in aircraft size. The 1950s saw US Navy's commission of "supercarriers", designed to operate naval jets, which offered better performance at the expense of bigger size and demanded more ordnance to be carried on-board (fuel, spare parts, electronics, etc.).
- The combination of increased carrier size, speed requirements above 30 knots (35 mph; 56 km/h), and a requirement to operate at sea for long periods mean that modern large aircraft carriers often use nuclear reactors to create power for propulsion, electricity, catapulting airplanes from aircraft carriers, and a few more minor uses.

Modern navies that operate such aircraft carriers treat them as capital ships of fleets, a role previously held by the galleons, ships-of-the-line and battleships. This change took place during World War II in response to air power becoming a significant factor in warfare, driven by the superior range, flexibility and effectiveness of carrier-launched aircraft. Following the war, carrier operations continued to increase in size and importance, and along with, carrier designs also increased in size and ability. Some of these larger carriers, dubbed by the media as "supercarriers", displacing 75,000 tons or greater, have become the pinnacle of carrier development. Some are powered by nuclear reactors and form the core of a fleet designed to operate far from home. Amphibious assault ships, such as the Wasp and Mistral classes, serve the purpose of carrying and landing Marines, and operate a large contingent of helicopters for that purpose. Also known as "commando carriers" or "helicopter carriers", many have the capability to operate VSTOL aircraft.

The threatening role of aircraft carriers has a place in modern asymmetric warfare, like the gunboat diplomacy of the past. Carriers also facilitate quick and precise projections of overwhelming military power into such local and regional conflicts.

Lacking the firepower of other warships, carriers by themselves are considered vulnerable to attack by other ships, aircraft, submarines, or missiles. Therefore, an aircraft carrier is generally accompanied by a number of other ships to provide protection for the relatively unwieldy carrier, to carry supplies, re-supply (Many carriers are self-sufficient and will supply their escorts) and perform other support services, and to provide additional offensive capabilities. The resulting group of ships is often termed a carrier strike group, battle group, carrier group, or carrier battle group.

There is a view among some military pundits that modern anti-ship weapons systems, such as torpedoes and missiles, or even ballistic missiles with nuclear warheads have made aircraft carriers and carrier groups too vulnerable for modern combat.

Carriers can also be vulnerable to diesel-electric submarines like the German U24 of the conventional 206 class which in 2001 "fired" at Enterprise during the exercise JTFEX 01-2 in the Caribbean Sea by firing flares and taking a photograph through its periscope or the Swedish Navy submarine Gotland, which managed the same feat in 2006 during JTFEX 06-2 by penetrating the defensive measures of Carrier Strike Group 7 which was protecting USS Ronald Reagan.

== Description ==
=== Structure ===
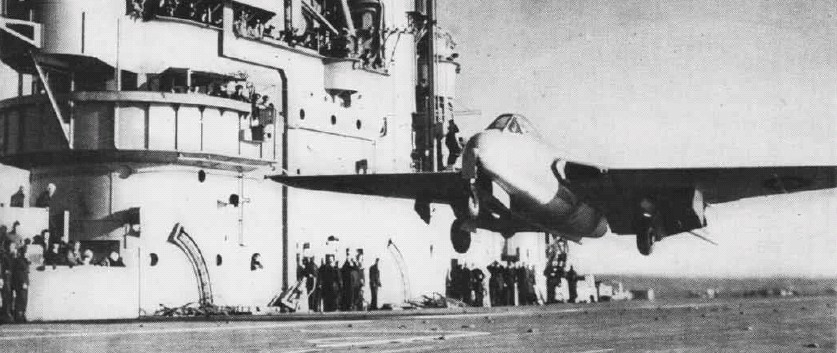
The first carrier landing and take-off of a jet aircraft: Eric "Winkle" Brown landing on HMS Ocean in 1945

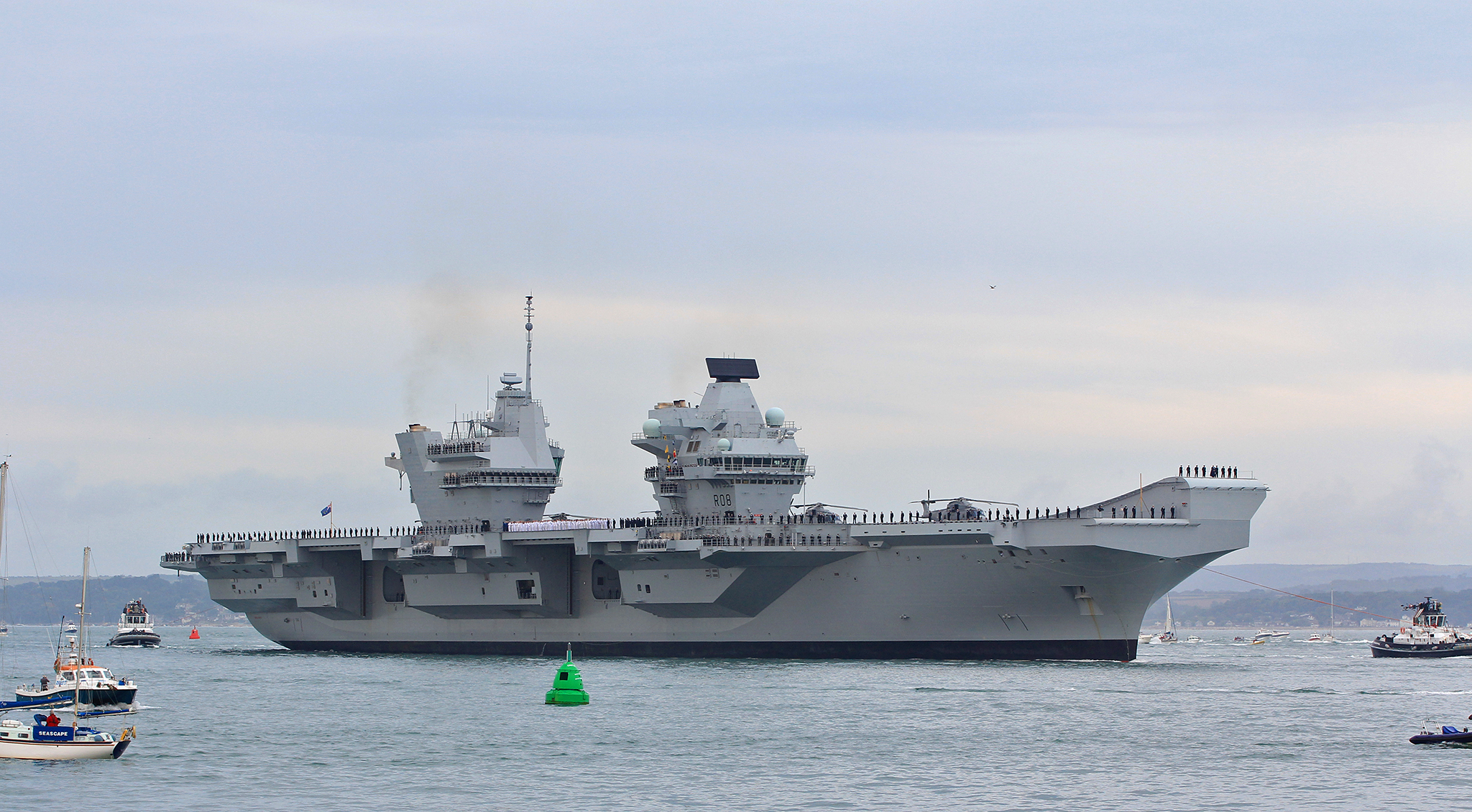
HMS Queen Elizabeth showing the ship's two islands

Carriers are large and long ships, although there is a high degree of variation depending on their intended role and aircraft complement. The size of the carrier has varied over history and among navies, to cater to the various roles that global climates have demanded from naval aviation.

Regardless of size, the ship itself must house their complement of aircraft, with space for launching, storing, and maintaining them. Space is also required for the large crew, supplies (food, munitions, fuel, engineering parts), and propulsion. US and French aircraft carriers are notable for having nuclear reactors powering their systems and propulsion.

The top of the carrier is the flight deck, where aircraft are launched and recovered. On the starboard side of this is the island, where ship navigation from the bridge and air traffic control from flyco are controlled and (in non-nuclear powered vessels), provides the location of the ship's funnel(s). The Queen Elizabeth-class has two island structures; the forward island contains the navigation bridge, while the aft structure houses flyco.

The constraints of constructing a flight deck strongly affect the role of a given carrier, as they influence the weight, type, and configuration of the aircraft that may be launched. For example, assisted launch mechanisms are used primarily for heavy aircraft, especially those loaded with air-to-ground weapons. CATOBAR is most commonly used on US Navy fleet carriers as it allows the deployment of heavy jets with full load-outs, especially on ground-attack missions. STOVL is used by other navies because it is cheaper to operate and still provides good deployment capability for fighter aircraft.

Due to the busy nature of the flight deck, only 20 or so aircraft may be on it at any one time. A hangar storage several decks below the flight deck is where most aircraft are kept, and aircraft are taken from the lower storage decks to the flight deck through the use of an elevator. The hangar is usually quite large and can take up several decks of vertical space.

Munitions are commonly stored on the lower decks because they are highly explosive. Usually this is below the waterline so that the area can be flooded in case of emergency.

=== Flight deck ===
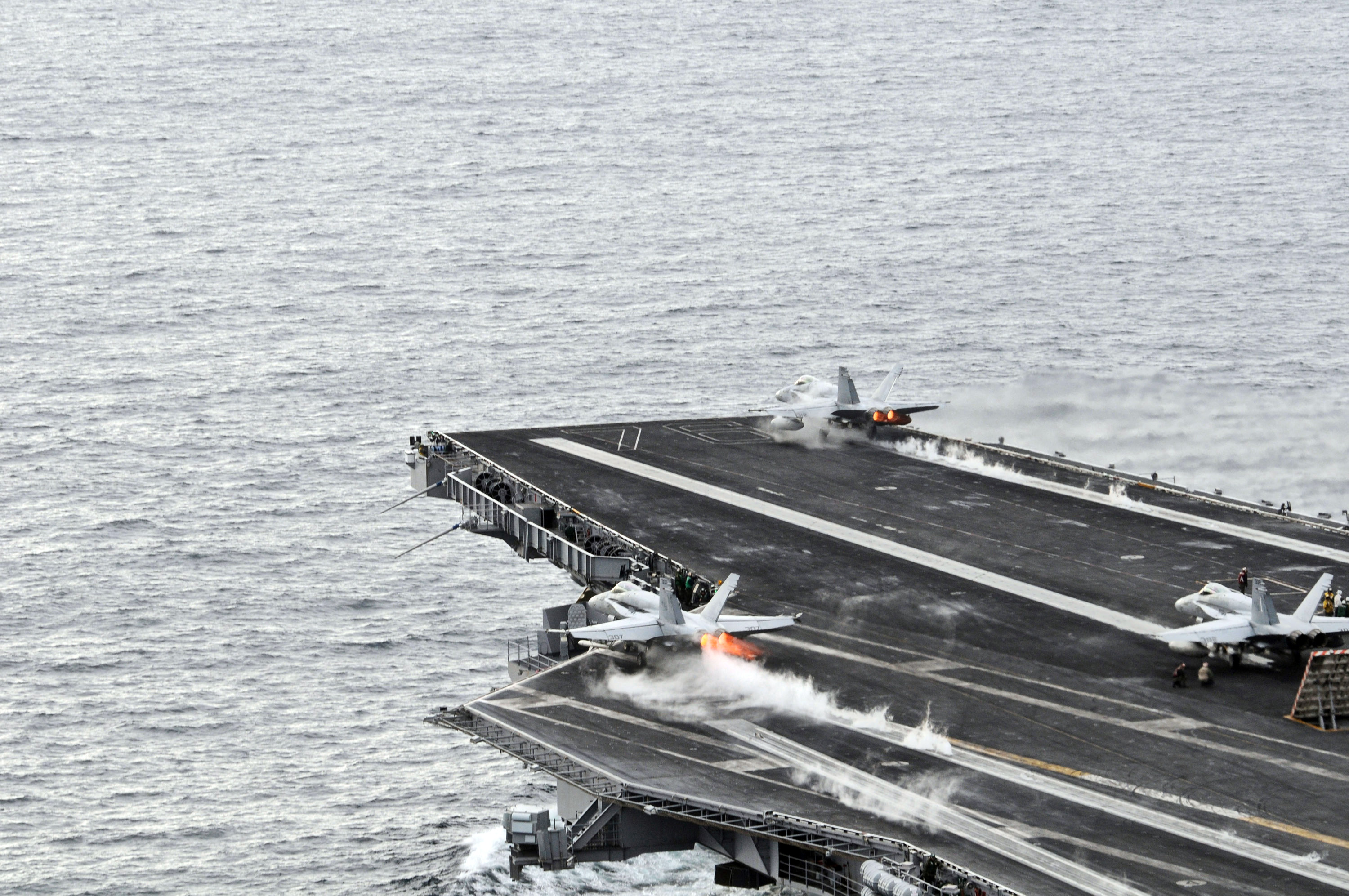
Catapult launches aboard USS Ronald Reagan

As "runways at sea", aircraft carriers have a flat-top flight deck, which launches and recovers aircraft. Aircraft launch forward, into the wind, and are recovered from astern. Creating such a surface at sea poses constraints on the carrier. For example, the size of the vessel is a fundamental limitation on runway length. This affects take-off procedure, as a shorter runway length of the deck requires that aircraft accelerate more quickly to gain lift. This either requires a thrust boost, a vertical component to its velocity, or a reduced take-off load (to lower mass). The differing types of deck configuration, as above, influence the structure of the flight deck. The form of launch assistance a carrier provides is strongly related to the types of aircraft embarked and the design of the carrier itself.

There are two main philosophies to keep the deck short: add thrust to the aircraft, such as using a Catapult Assisted Take-Off (CATO-); and changing the direction of the airplanes' thrust, as in Vertical and/or Short Take-Off (V/STO-). Each method has advantages and disadvantages of its own:

- Catapult Assisted Take-Off Barrier Arrested Recovery (CATOBAR): A steam- or electric-powered catapult is connected to the aircraft, and is used to accelerate conventional aircraft to a safe flying speed. By the end of the catapult stroke, the aircraft is airborne and further propulsion is provided by its own engines. This is the most expensive method as it requires complex machinery to be installed under the flight deck, but allows for even heavily loaded aircraft to take off.
- Short Take-Off Barrier Arrested Recovery (STOBAR) depends on increasing the net lift on the aircraft. Aircraft do not require catapult assistance for take off; instead on nearly all ships of this type an upwards vector is provided by a ski-jump at the forward end of the flight deck, often combined with thrust vectoring by the aircraft. Alternatively, by reducing the fuel and weapon load, an aircraft is able to reach faster speeds and generate more upwards lift and launch without a ski-jump or catapult.
- Short Take-Off Vertical-Landing (STOVL): On aircraft carriers, non-catapult-assisted, fixed-wing short takeoffs are accomplished with the use of thrust vectoring, which may also be used in conjunction with a runway "ski-jump". Use of STOVL tends to allow aircraft to carry a larger payload as compared to during VTOL use, while still only requiring a short runway. The most famous examples are the Hawker Siddeley Harrier and the BAe Sea Harrier. Although technically VTOL aircraft, they are operationally STOVL aircraft due to the extra weight carried at take-off for fuel and armaments. The same is true of the Lockheed F-35B Lightning II, which demonstrated VTOL capability in test flights but is operationally STOVL or in the case of UK uses "shipborne rolling vertical landing".
- Vertical Take-Off and Landing (VTOL): Certain aircraft are specifically designed for the purpose of using very high degrees of thrust vectoring (e.g. if the thrust to weight-force ratio is greater than 1, it can take off vertically), but are usually slower than conventionally propelled aircraft due to the additional weight from associated systems.

On the recovery side of the flight deck, the adaptation to the aircraft load-out is mirrored. Non-VTOL or conventional aircraft cannot decelerate on their own, and almost all carriers using them must have arrested-recovery systems (-BAR, e.g. CATOBAR or STOBAR) to recover their aircraft. Aircraft that are landing extend a tailhook that catches on arrestor wires stretched across the deck to bring themselves to a stop in a short distance. Post-World War II Royal Navy research on safer CATOBAR recovery eventually led to universal adoption of a landing area angled off axis to allow aircraft who missed the arresting wires to "bolt" and safely return to flight for another landing attempt rather than crashing into aircraft on the forward deck.

If the aircraft are VTOL-capable or helicopters, they do not need to decelerate and hence there is no such need. The arrested-recovery system has used an angled deck since the 1950s because, in case the aircraft does not catch the arresting wire, the short deck allows easier take off by reducing the number of objects between the aircraft and the end of the runway. It also has the advantage of separating the recovery operation area from the launch area. Helicopters and aircraft capable of vertical or short take-off and landing (V/STOL) usually recover by coming abreast of the carrier on the port side and then using their hover capability to move over the flight deck and land vertically without the need for arresting gear.

==== Staff and deck operations ====
F/A-18 Hornet aircraft landing video

Carriers steam at speed, up to 35 knots (65 km/h; 40 mph) into the wind during flight deck operations to increase wind speed over the deck to a safe minimum. This increase in effective wind speed provides a higher launch airspeed for aircraft at the end of the catapult stroke or ski-jump, as well as making recovery safer by reducing the difference between the relative speeds of the aircraft and ship.

Since the early 1950s on conventional carriers it has been the practice to recover aircraft at an angle to port of the axial line of the ship. The primary function of this angled deck is to allow aircraft that miss the arresting wires, referred to as a bolter, to become airborne again without the risk of hitting aircraft parked forward. The angled deck allows the installation of one or two "waist" catapults in addition to the two bow cats. An angled deck also improves launch and recovery cycle flexibility with the option of simultaneous launching and recovery of aircraft.

Conventional ("tailhook") aircraft rely upon a landing signal officer (LSO, radio call sign 'paddles') to monitor the aircraft's approach, visually gauge glideslope, attitude, and airspeed, and transmit that data to the pilot. Before the angled deck emerged in the 1950s, LSOs used colored paddles to signal corrections to the pilot (hence the nickname). From the late 1950s onward, visual landing aids such as the optical landing system have provided information on proper glide slope, but LSOs still transmit voice calls to approaching pilots by radio.

Key personnel involved in the flight deck include the shooters, the handler, and the air boss. Shooters are naval aviators or naval flight officers and are responsible for launching aircraft. The handler works just inside the island from the flight deck and is responsible for the movement of aircraft before launching and after recovery. The "air boss" (usually a commander) occupies the top bridge (Primary Flight Control, also called primary or the tower) and has the overall responsibility for controlling launch, recovery and "those aircraft in the air near the ship, and the movement of planes on the flight deck, which itself resembles a well-choreographed ballet". The captain of the ship spends most of his time one level below primary on the Navigation Bridge. Below this is the Flag Bridge, designated for the embarked admiral and his staff.

To facilitate working on the flight deck of a US aircraft carrier, the sailors wear colored shirts that designate their responsibilities. There are at least seven different colors worn by flight deck personnel for modern United States Navy carrier air operations. Carrier operations of other nations use similar color schemes.

==== Deck structures ====
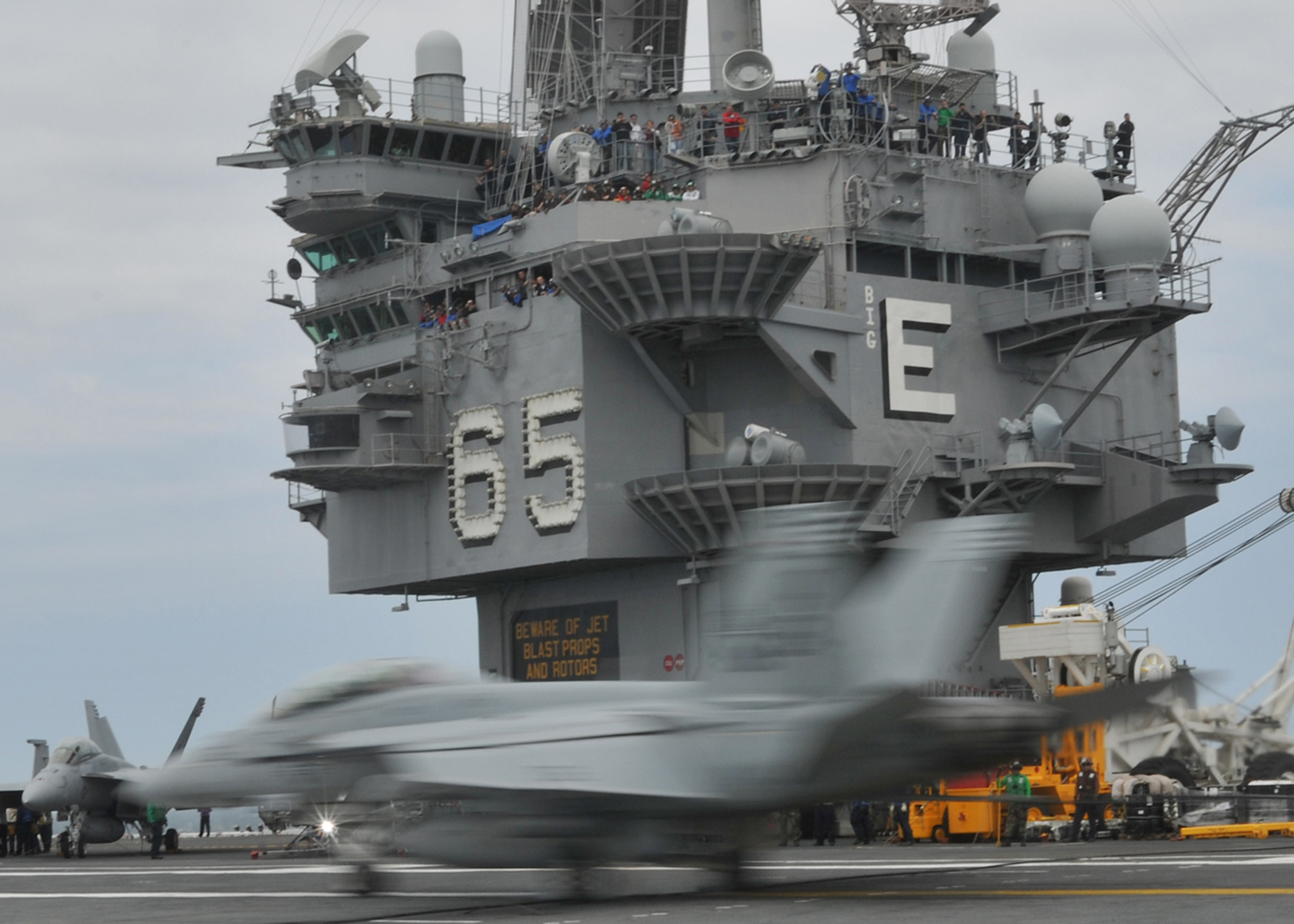
Island control structure of USS Enterprise

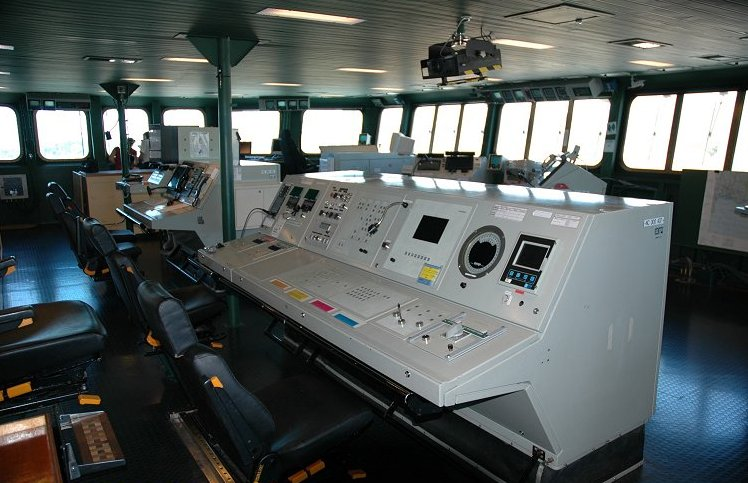
The command bridge of the aircraft carrier Charles de Gaulle

The superstructure of a carrier (such as the bridge, flight control tower) are concentrated in a relatively small area called an island, a feature pioneered on HMS Hermes in 1923. While the island is usually built on the starboard side of the flight deck, the Japanese aircraft carriers Akagi and Hiryū had their islands built on the port side. Very few carriers have been designed or built without an island. The flush deck configuration proved to have significant drawbacks, primary of which was management of the exhaust from the power plant. Fumes coming across the deck were a major issue in USS Langley. In addition, lack of an island meant difficulties managing the flight deck, performing air traffic control, a lack of radar housing placements and problems with navigating and controlling the ship itself.

Another deck structure that can be seen is a ski-jump ramp at the forward end of the flight deck. This was first developed to help launch short take off vertical landing (STOVL) aircraft take off at far higher weights than is possible with a vertical or rolling takeoff on flat decks. Originally developed by the Royal Navy, it since has been adopted by many navies for smaller carriers. A ski-jump ramp works by converting some of the forward rolling movement of the aircraft into vertical velocity and is sometimes combined with the aiming of jet thrust partly downward. This allows heavily loaded and fueled aircraft a few more precious seconds to attain sufficient air velocity and lift to sustain normal flight. Without a ski-jump, launching fully-loaded and fueled aircraft such as the Harrier would not be possible on a smaller flat deck ship before either stalling out or crashing directly into the sea.

Although STOVL aircraft are capable of taking off vertically from a spot on the deck, using the ramp and a running start is far more fuel efficient and permits a heavier launch weight. As catapults are unnecessary, carriers with this arrangement reduce weight, complexity, and space needed for complex steam or electromagnetic launching equipment. Vertical landing aircraft also remove the need for arresting cables and related hardware. Russian, Chinese, and Indian carriers include a ski-jump ramp for launching lightly loaded conventional fighter aircraft but recover using traditional carrier arresting cables and a tailhook on their aircraft.

The disadvantage of the ski-jump is the penalty it exacts on aircraft size, payload, and fuel load (and thus range); heavily laden aircraft cannot launch using a ski-jump because their high loaded weight requires either a longer takeoff roll than is possible on a carrier deck, or assistance from a catapult or JATO rocket. For example, the Russian Sukhoi Su-33 is only able to launch from the carrier Admiral Kuznetsov with a minimal armament and fuel load. Another disadvantage is on mixed flight deck operations where helicopters are also present, such as on a US landing helicopter dock or landing helicopter assault amphibious assault ship. A ski jump is not included as this would eliminate one or more helicopter landing areas; this flat deck limits the loading of Harriers but is somewhat mitigated by the longer rolling start provided by a long flight deck compared to many STOVL carriers.

== National fleets ==
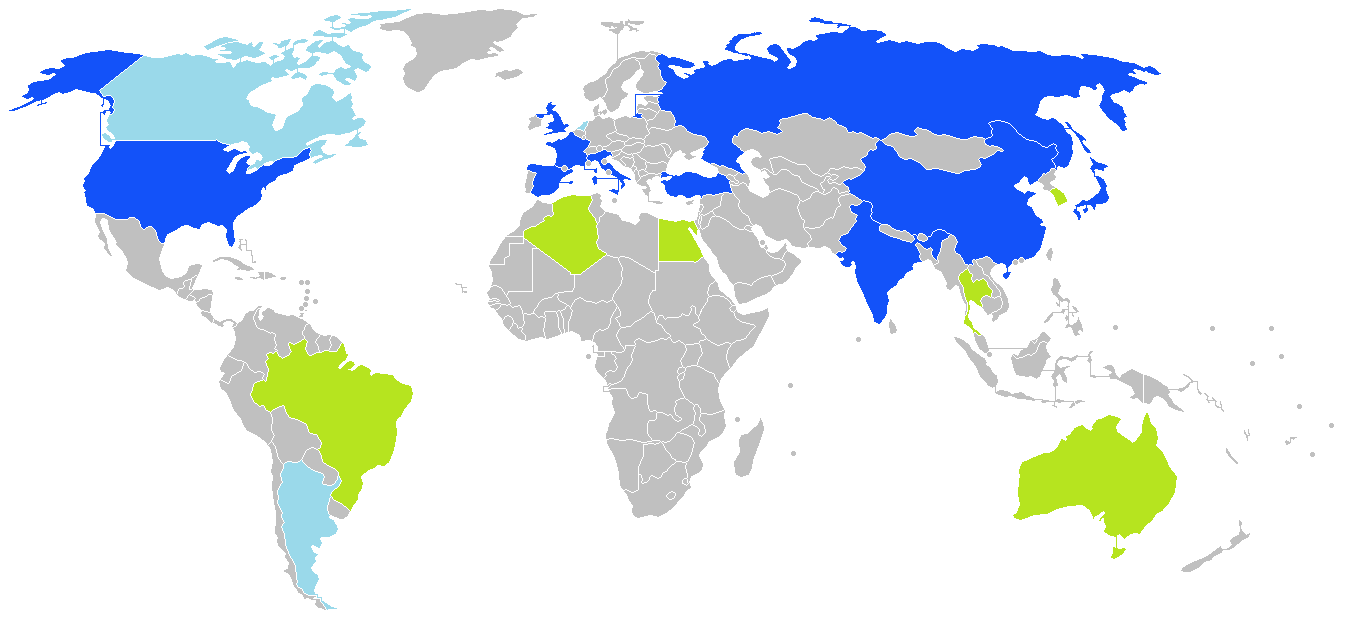
Countries currently operating fixed-wing aircraft carriers (10) (Note that Russia has only one aircraft carrier which is inactive and under maintenance since 2018) Countries currently solely operating helicopter carriers (6) Countries that have operated carriers in the past but no longer do so (3)

The United States operates 11 nuclear-powered, catapult-assisted carriers, with a total combined deck space over twice that of all other nations combined as of 2016. China operates one catapult-assisted aircraft carrier and two ski-jump carriers. The United Kingdom and India each currently operate two ski-jump aircraft carriers, and France operates one nuclear-powered, catapult-assisted carrier. Russia deploys one ski-jump carrier, although it has not been operational since 2017.

In addition, the US operates nine large amphibious assault ships with the capability to launch vertical/short takeoff and landing (V/STOL) aircraft, and China operates four amphibious assault ships of a similar size as helicopter carriers. Italy operates two light V/STOL carriers, and both Spain and Iran operate one V/STOL aircraft-carrying assault ship. Helicopter carriers are also operated by Japan (4, two converting to operate V/STOL fighters) France (3), Australia (2), Egypt (2), South Korea (2), Thailand (1), Brazil (1), Iran (1), and Indonesia (1). Future aircraft carriers are under construction or planned by China, France, India, Italy, Russia, South Korea, and the US.

=== Algeria ===
Current

Kalaat Béni Abbès (L-474) is an amphibious transport dock of the Algerian National Navy with two deck-landing spots for helicopters.

=== Australia ===
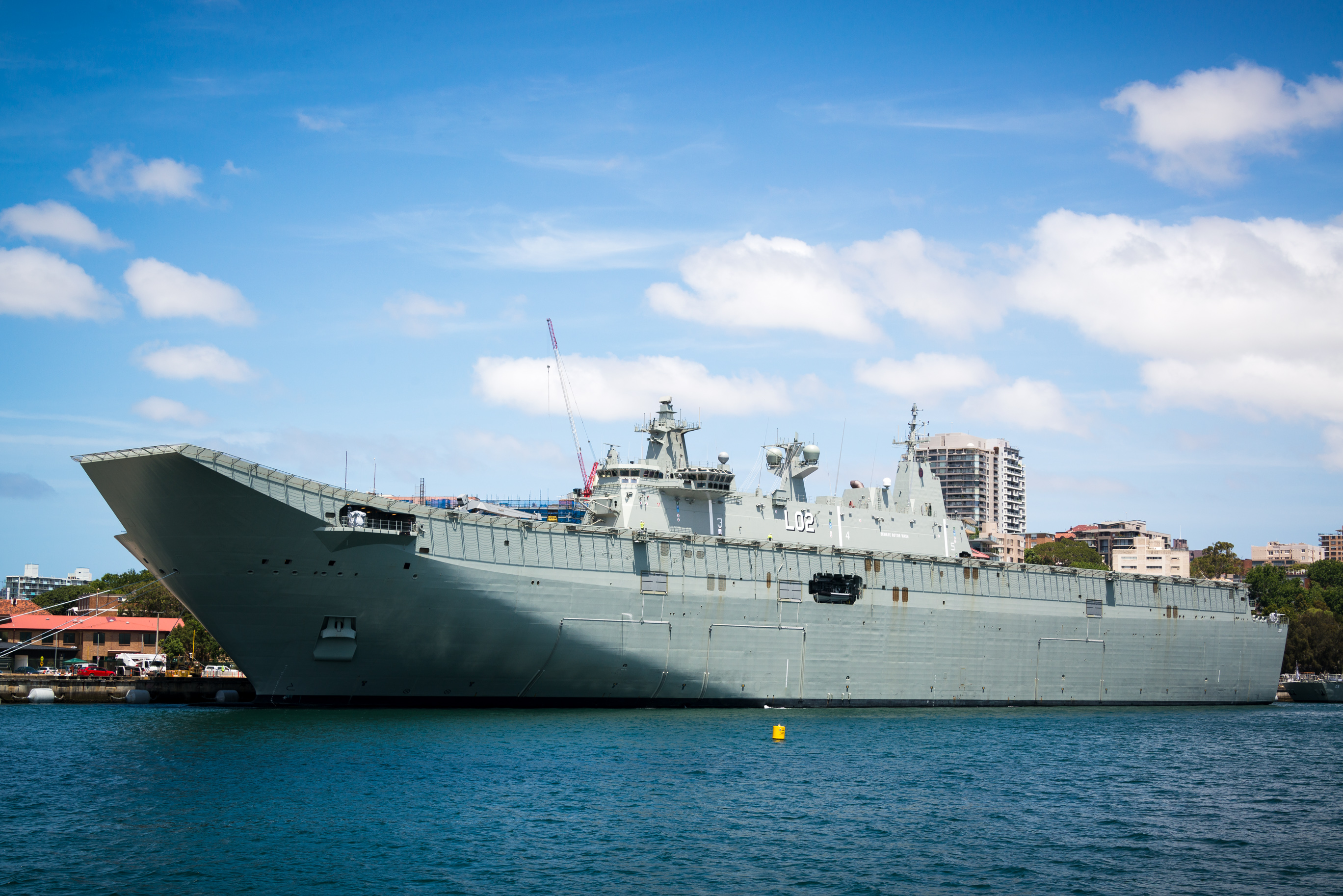
HMAS Canberra, a Canberra-class landing helicopter dock

Current

The Royal Australian Navy operates two Canberra-class landing helicopter docks. The two-ship class, based on the Spanish vessel Juan Carlos I and built by Navantia and BAE Systems Australia, represents the largest ships ever built for the Royal Australian Navy.

HMAS Canberra underwent sea trials in late 2013 and was commissioned in 2014. Her sister ship, HMAS Adelaide, was commissioned in December 2015. The Australian ships retain the ski-ramp from the Juan Carlos I design, although the RAN has not acquired carrier-based fixed-wing aircraft.

=== Brazil ===
Current

In December 2017, the Brazilian Navy confirmed the purchase of HMS Ocean for (GBP) £84.6 million (equivalent to R$359.5M and US$113.2M) and renamed her Atlântico. The ship was decommissioned from Royal Navy service in March 2018. The Brazilian Navy commissioned the carrier on 29 June 2018 in the United Kingdom. After undertaking a period of maintenance in the UK, the ship travelled to its new home port, Rio de Janeiro Navy Arsenal (AMRJ) to be fully operational by 2020. The ship displaces 21,578 tonnes, is 203.43 meters (667.4 ft) long and has a range of 8,000 nautical miles (15,000 km; 9,200 mi).

Before leaving HMNB Devonport for her new homeport in Rio's AMRJ, Atlântico underwent operational sea training under the Royal Navy's Flag Officer Sea Training (FOST) program.

On 12 November 2020, Atlântico was redesignated "NAM", for "multipurpose aircraft carrier" (Portuguese: Navio Aeródromo Multipropósito), from "PHM", for "multipurpose helicopter carrier" (Portuguese: Porta-Helicópteros Multipropósito), to reflect the ship's capability to operate with fixed-wing medium-altitude long-endurance unmanned aerial vehicles as well as crewed tiltrotor VTOL aircraft.

=== China ===
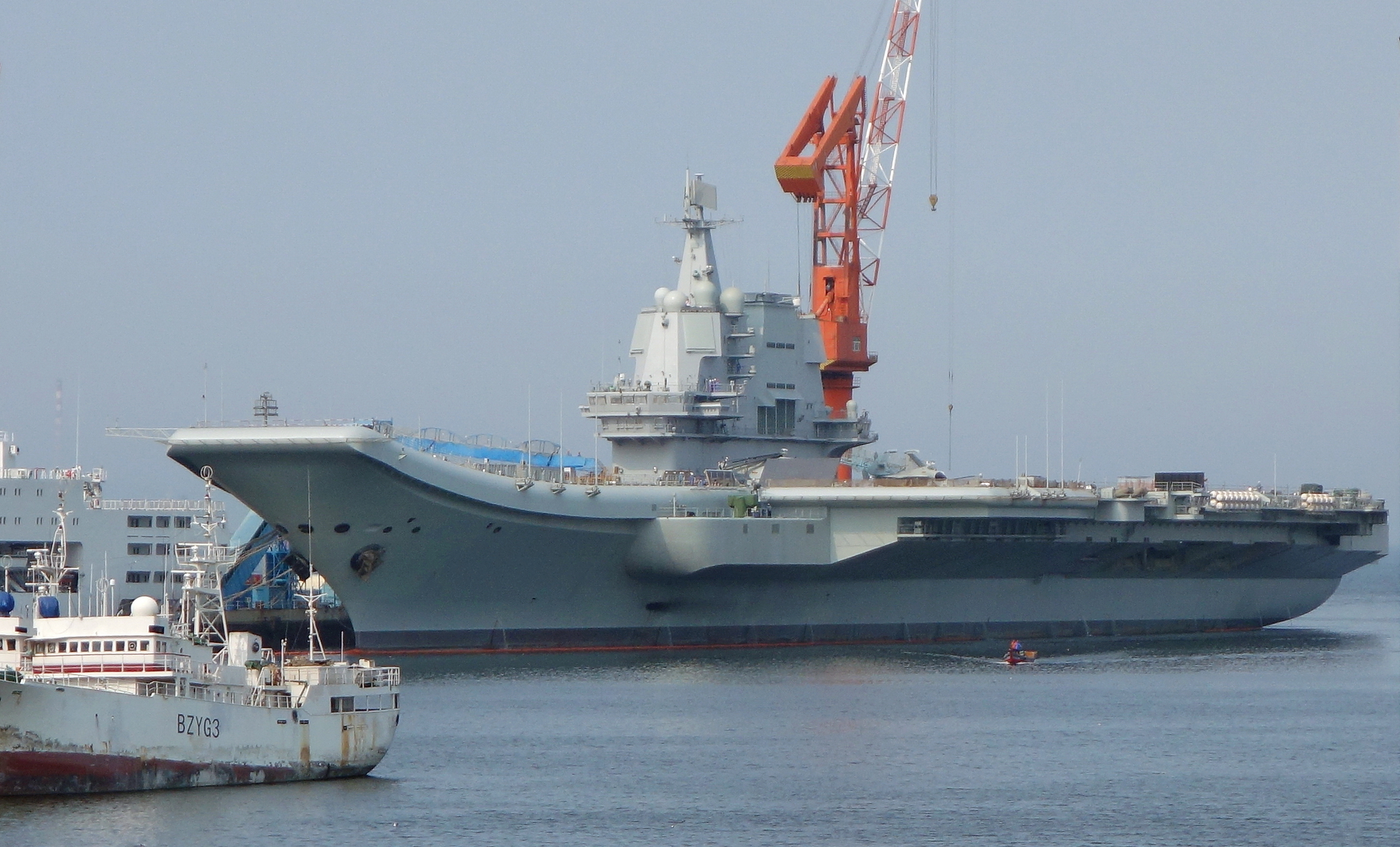
Shandong, a Type 002 aircraft carrier

Current

Two STOBAR carriers:

- Liaoning (60,900 tons) was originally built as the uncompleted Soviet Kuznetsov-class carrier Varyag and was later purchased as a hulk from Ukraine in 1998 on the pretext of commercial use as a floating casino, then towed to China for rebuild and completion. Liaoning was commissioned on 25 September 2012 and began service for testing and training. In November 2012, Liaoning launched and recovered Shenyang J-15 naval fighter aircraft for the first time. After a refit in January 2019, she was assigned to the North Sea Fleet, a change from her previous role as a training ship.
- Shandong (60,000–70,000 tons) was launched on 26 April 2017, the first to be built domestically based on an improved Kuznetsov-class design. Shandong started sea trials on 23 April 2018, and entered service in December 2019.

One CATOBAR carrier:

- Fujian (80,000 tons) is a conventionally-powered CATOBAR carrier that was under construction between 2015 and 2016 before being completed in June 2022. She was commissioned on 5 November 2025 at the Sanya Naval Base.

Four amphibious assault ships

- Type 075 LHD (35–40,000 tons): A class of helicopter carriers with full-length flight decks for aircraft and floodable well-decks for amphibious assault. The first, Hainan was commissioned on 23 April 2021 at the South Sea Fleet naval base in Sanya. Followed by the commissioning of the Guangxi on 26 December 2021 Anhui in October 2022, and Hubei on 1 August 2025.

Future

The Type 004 aircraft carrier is an upcoming class of Chinese aircraft carrier under-construction. It is expected to be larger than the Type 003 Fujian and is widely reported to incorporate nuclear marine propulsion, 4-5 electromagnetic aircraft launch systems (EMALS), and an integrated electric propulsion system. Its displacement is commonly estimated at around 110,000–120,000 tonnes. China has had a long-term plan to operate six large aircraft carriers with two carriers per fleet.

China is planning a class of eight LHD vessels, the Type 075 (NATO reporting name Yushen-class landing helicopter assault). This is a class of amphibious assault ship under construction by the Hudong–Zhonghua Shipbuilding company. The first ship was commissioned in April 2021. China is also planning a modified class of the same concept, the Type 076 landing helicopter dock, that will be equipped with an electromagnetic catapult system and will likely support launching unmanned combat aerial vehicles.

=== Egypt ===
Current

Egypt signed a contract with French shipbuilder DCNS to buy two Mistral-class helicopter carriers for approximately 950 million euros. The two ships were originally to be sold to Russia, but the deal was cancelled by France due to the Russian invasion of Ukraine in 2014.

On 2 June 2016, Egypt received the first of two helicopter carriers acquired in October 2015, the landing helicopter dock Gamal Abdel Nasser. The flag transfer ceremony took place in the presence of Egyptian and French Navies' chiefs of staff, chairman and chief executive officers of both DCNS and STX France, and senior Egyptian and French officials. On 16 September 2016, DCNS delivered the second of two helicopter carriers, the landing helicopter dock Anwar El Sadat which also participated in a joint military exercise with the French Navy before arriving at her home port of Alexandria.

=== France ===
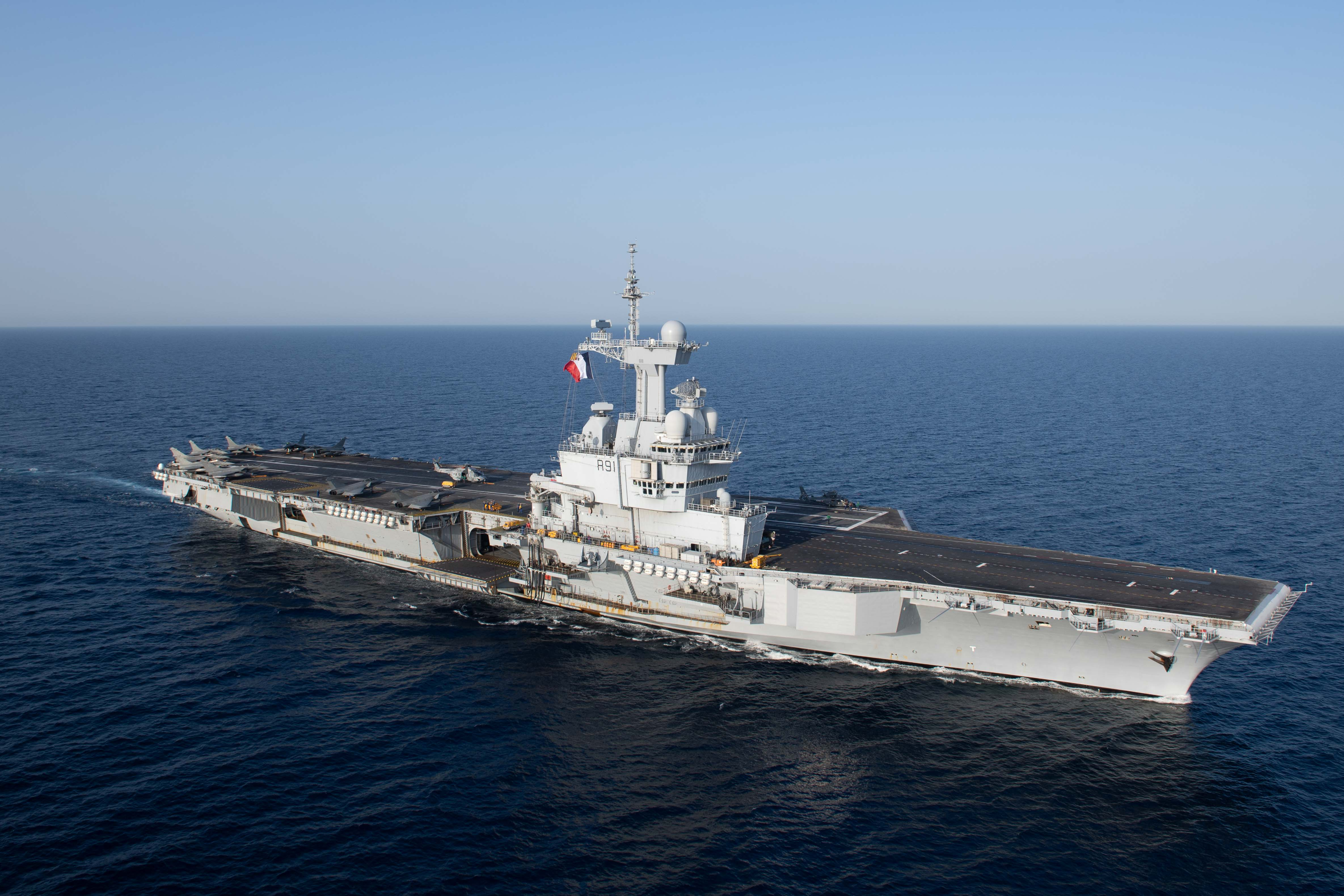
The aircraft carrier Charles de Gaulle of the French Navy

Current

The French Navy operates the 42,000-tonne nuclear-powered aircraft carrier, Charles de Gaulle. Commissioned in 2001, she is the flagship of the French Navy. The ship carries a complement of Dassault Rafale M and E-2C Hawkeye aircraft, EC725 Caracal and AS532 Cougar helicopters for combat search and rescue, as well as modern electronics and Aster missiles. She is a CATOBAR-type carrier that uses two 75 m C13-3 steam catapults of a shorter version of the catapult system installed on the US Nimitz-class carriers, one catapult at the bow and one across the front of the landing area. In addition, the French Navy operates three Mistral-class landing helicopter docks.

Future

In October 2018, the French Ministry of Defence began an 18-month €40 million study for the replacement of the French aircraft carrier Charles de Gaulle sometime after 2030. In December 2020, President Macron announced that construction of the next generation carrier would begin in around 2025 with sea trials to start in about 2036. The carrier is planned to have a displacement of around 75,000 tons and to carry about 32 next-generation fighters, two to three E-2D Advanced Hawkeyes and a yet-to-be-determined number of unmanned carrier air vehicles.

=== India ===
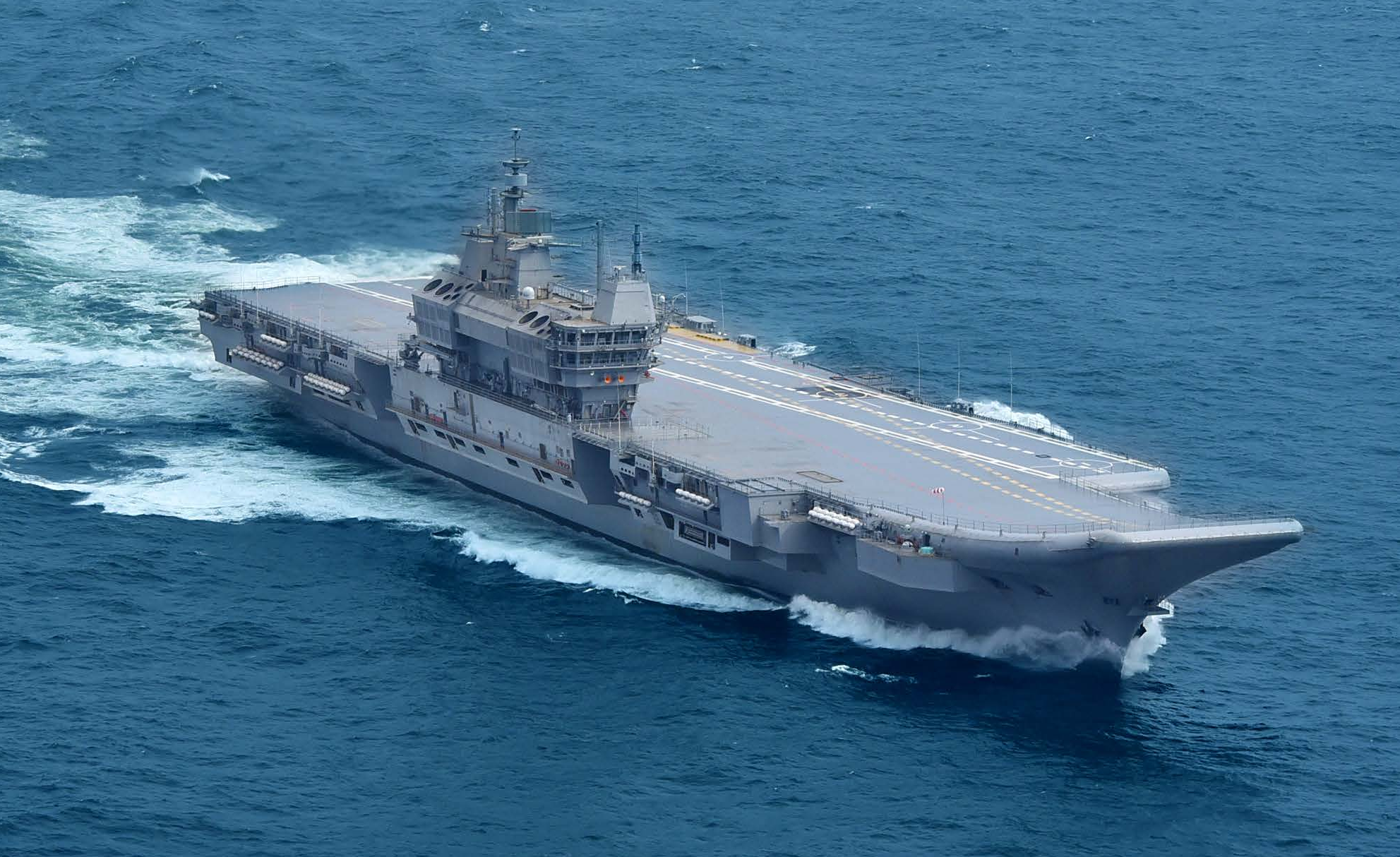
INS Vikrant (IAC-1) at sea during her maiden sea trials

Current

Two STOBAR carriers:

- INS Vikramaditya, 45,400 tonnes, modified Kiev class. The carrier was purchased by India on 20 January 2004 after years of negotiations at a final price of $2.35 billion. The ship successfully completed her sea trials in July 2013 and aviation trials in September 2013. She was formally commissioned on 16 November 2013 at a ceremony held at Severodvinsk, Russia.
- INS Vikrant, also known as Indigenous Aircraft Carrier 1 (IAC-1) a 45,000-tonne, 262-metre-long (860 ft) aircraft carrier whose keel was laid in 2009. The new carrier will operate MiG-29K and naval HAL Tejas aircraft. The ship is powered by gas-turbines and deploys 10 helicopters and 30 aircraft. The ship was launched in 2013, sea-trials began in August 2021 and was commissioned on 2 September 2022.

Future

India has plans for a third carrier, INS Vishal, also known as Indigenous Aircraft Carrier 2 (IAC-2) with a displacement of over 65,000 tonnes and is planned with a CATOBAR system to launch and recover heavier aircraft.

India has also issued a request for information (RFI) to procure four Landing helicopter dock displacing 30,000–40,000 tons with a capacity to operate 12 medium lift special ops and two heavy lift helicopters and troops for amphibious operations.

=== Indonesia ===
Current

KRI Sriwijaya is a 14,000-tonne STOVL carrier, formerly the Giuseppe Garibaldi from Italy, commissioned in September 2026. Modernization is planned to adapt it to Indonesian Navy requirements. The ship would be used for helicopter operations and humanitarian assistance/disaster relief.

=== Italy ===
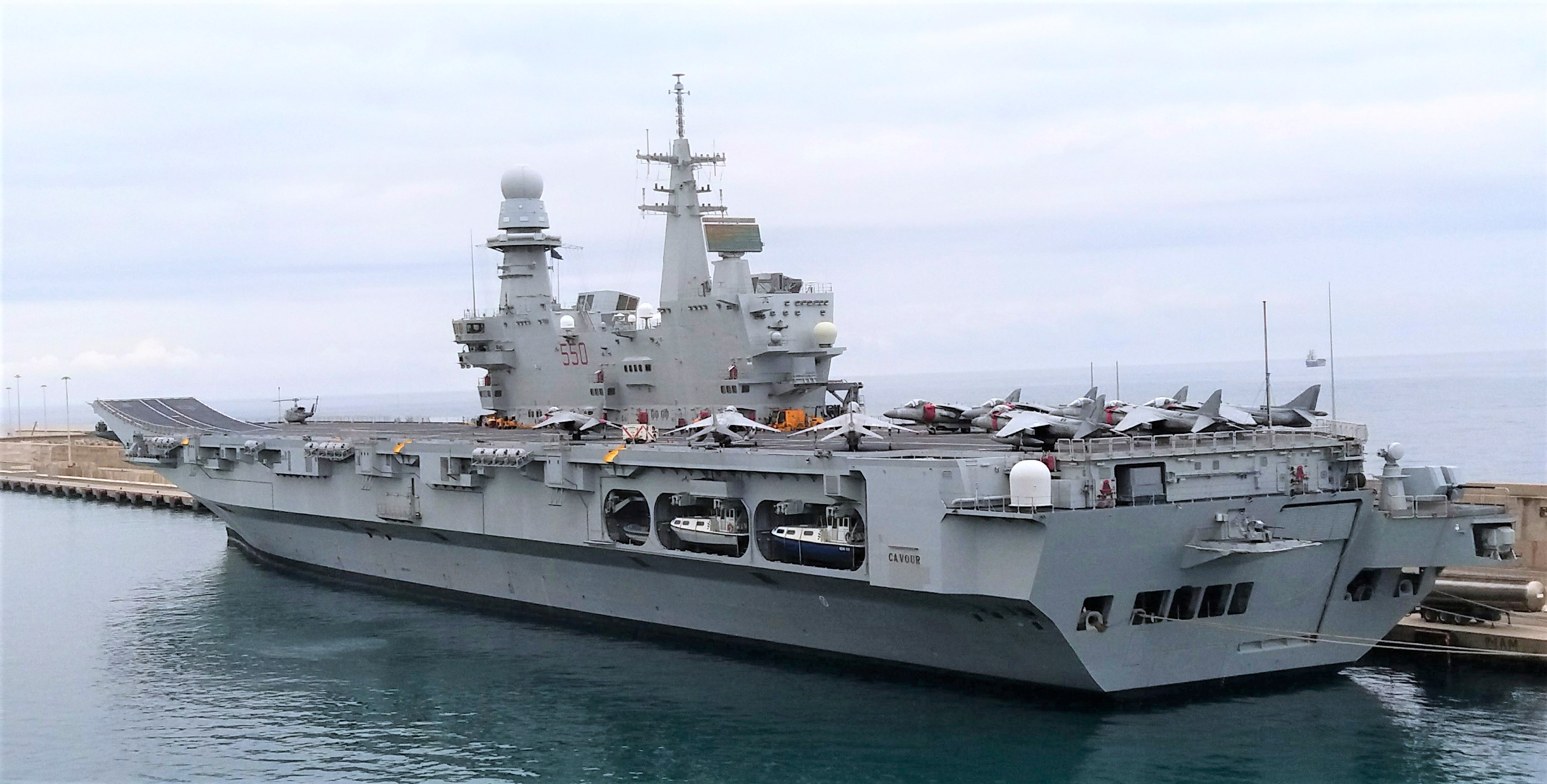
Italian aircraft carrier Cavour (550)

Current

One STOVL carrier:

- Cavour: 30,000-tonne Italian STOVL carrier designed and built with secondary amphibious assault facilities, commissioned in 2008.

One LHD Amphibious Assault Ship:

- Trieste: 38,000-tonne Italian LHD designed to replace Giuseppe Garibaldi with the capability to operate F-35s.

Future

Trieste is to carry the F-35B Joint Strike Fighter. In 2026, it was announced that the Giuseppe Garibaldi will be transferred to the Indonesian Navy.

=== Iran ===
Current

On 6 February 2025, the Islamic Revolutionary Guards Corps (IRGC) accepted the IRIS Shahid Bagheri, a 41,978-tonne drone UAV carrier converted from a container ship. The vessel has since been sunk in US airstrikes.

=== Japan ===
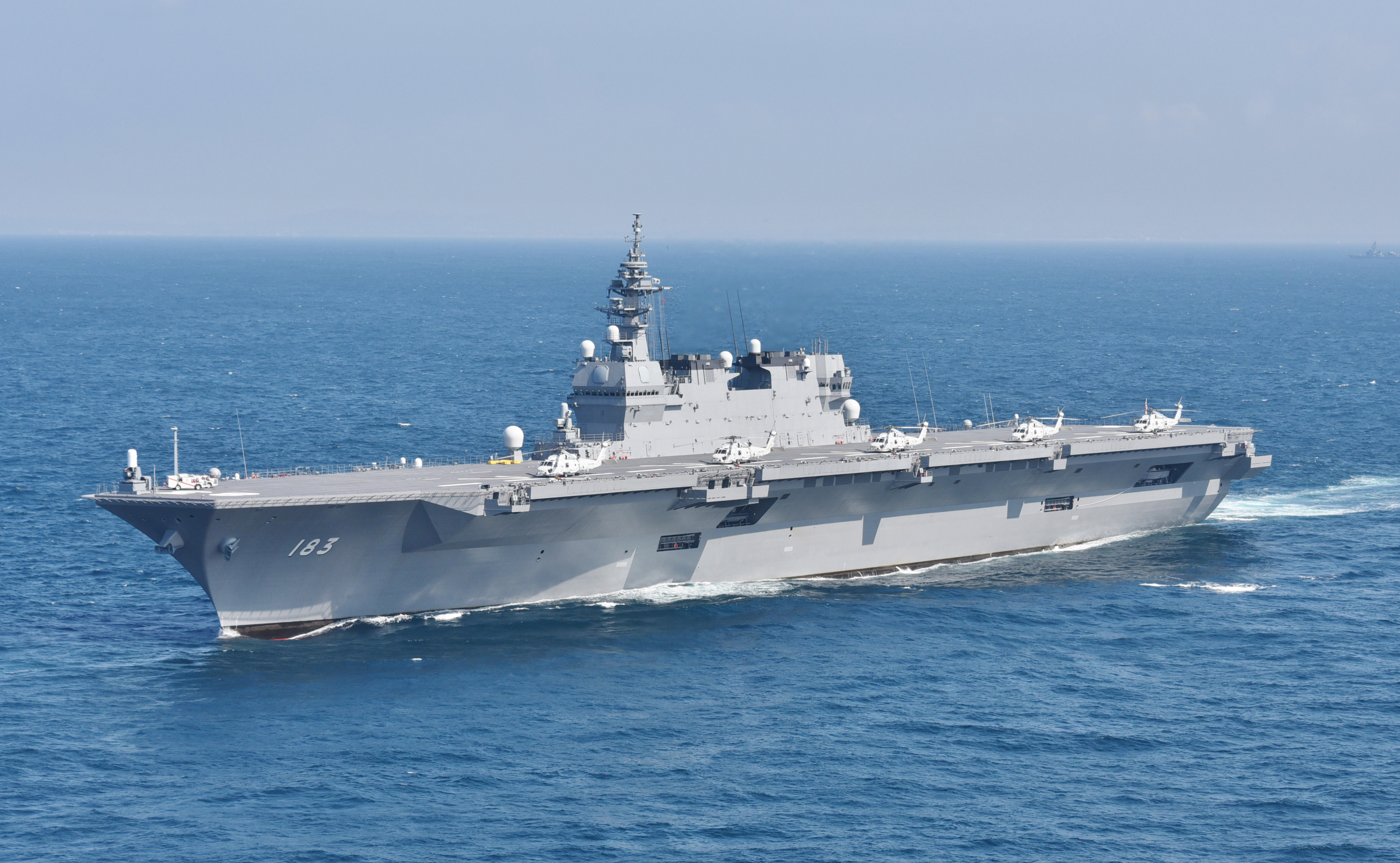
Helicopter carrier Izumo (DDH-183) at sea

Current
Two Izumo-class multi-purpose destroyers – 250-metre-long (820 ft), 19,500-tonne (27,000 tonnes full load) STOVL carrier Izumo was launched August 2013 and commissioned March 2015. Izumo's sister ship, Kaga, was commissioned in 2017. In December 2018, the Japanese Cabinet gave approval to convert both Izumo-class destroyers into aircraft carriers for F-35B STOVL operations. The conversion of Izumo was underway as of mid-2020. The modification of maritime escort vessels is to "increase operational flexibility" and enhance Pacific air defense, the Japanese defense ministry's position is "We are not creating carrier air wings or carrier air squadrons" similar to the US Navy. The Japanese STOVL F-35s, when delivered, will be operated by the Japan Air Self Defense Force from land bases; according to the 2020 Japanese Defense Ministry white paper the STOVL model was chosen for the JASDF due the lack of appropriately long runways to support air superiority capability across all of Japanese airspace. Japan has requested that the USMC deploy STOVL F-35s and crews aboard the Izumo-class ships "for cooperation and advice on how to operate the fighter on the deck of the modified ships".
On 3 October 2021, two USMC F-35Bs performed the first vertical landings and horizontal take-offs from JS Izumo, marking 75 years since fixed-wing aircraft operated from a Japanese carrier.

- Two Hyūga-class helicopter destroyers – 19,000-tonne (full load) anti-submarine warfare carriers with enhanced command-and-control capabilities allowing them to serve as fleet flagships.

=== Portugal ===
Portuguese Navy plans, for the second half of 2026, to receive the NRP D. João II, a platform ship capable of operating aerial, surface and underwater drones, medium helicopters (Sikorsky UH-60 Black Hawk) and heavy helicopters (EH101 Merlin) helicopters of the Portuguese Air Force.

=== Qatar ===
Current

- Qatari amphibious transport dock Al Fulk

=== Russia ===
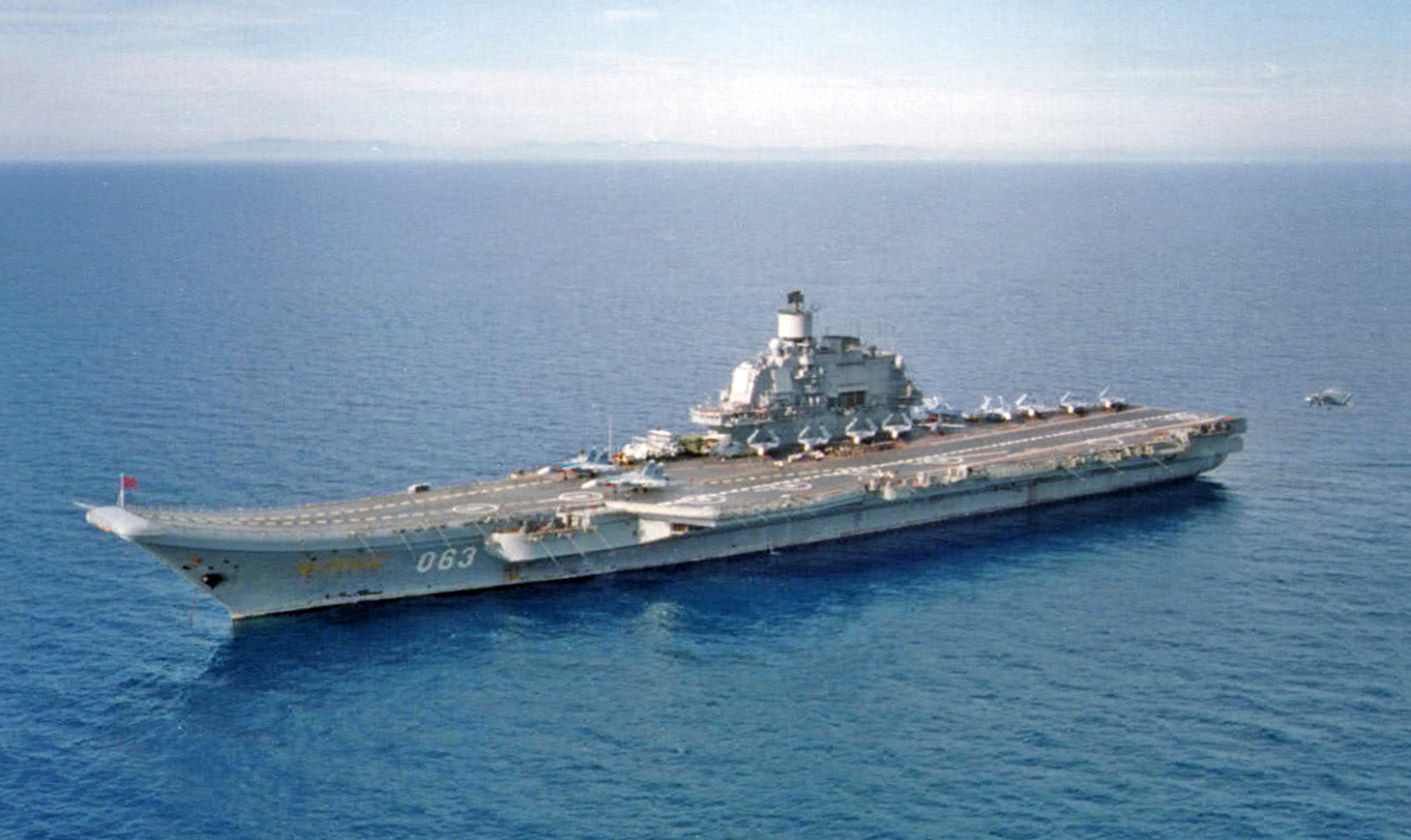
Russian aircraft carrier Admiral Kuznetsov

Current

One STOBAR carrier: Admiral Flota Sovetskogo Soyuza Kuznetsov: 55,000-tonne Kuznetsov-class STOBAR aircraft carrier. Launched in 1985 as Tbilisi, renamed and operational from 1995. Without catapults she can launch and recover lightly fueled naval fighters for air defense or anti-ship missions but not heavy conventional bombing strikes. Officially designated an aircraft carrying cruiser, she is unique in carrying a heavy cruiser's complement of defensive weapons and large P-700 Granit offensive missiles. The P-700 systems will be removed in the coming refit to enlarge her below decks aviation facilities as well as upgrading her defensive systems.

The ship has been out of service and in repairs since 2018. The most recent projection stated that repairs would be completed and the ship transferred back to the Russian Navy sometime in 2024, however this projection has not been met as of July 2025, and no updates have been provided.

Future

The Russian government has been considering the potential replacement of Admiral Kuznetsov for some time and has considered the Shtorm-class aircraft carrier as a possible option. This carrier will be a hybrid of CATOBAR and STOBAR, given the fact that she uses both systems of launching aircraft. The carrier is expected to cost between $1.8 billion and $5.63 billion. As of 2020, the project had not yet been approved and, given the financial costs, it was unclear whether it would be made a priority over other elements of Russian naval modernization.

A class of 2 LHD, Project 23900 is planned and an official keel laying ceremony for the project happened on 20 July 2020.

=== South Korea ===
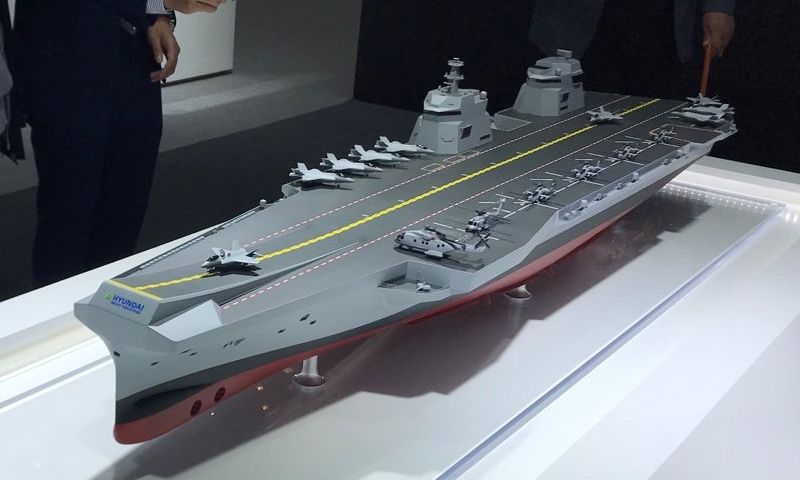
Conceptual model of CVX-class aircraft carrier

Current

Two Dokdo-class 18,860-tonne full deck amphibious assault ships with hospital and well deck and facilities to serve as fleet flagships.

Future

South Korea had set tentative plans for procuring two light aircraft carriers by 2033, which would help make the ROKN a blue water navy. In December 2020, details of South Korea's planned carrier program (CVX) were finalized. A vessel of about 40,000 tons is envisaged carrying about 20 F-35B fighters as well as future maritime attack helicopters. Service entry had been anticipated in the early 2030s. Basic design work was to start in 2022. In 2025 the program was cancelled and replaced with a drone carrier program.

=== Spain ===
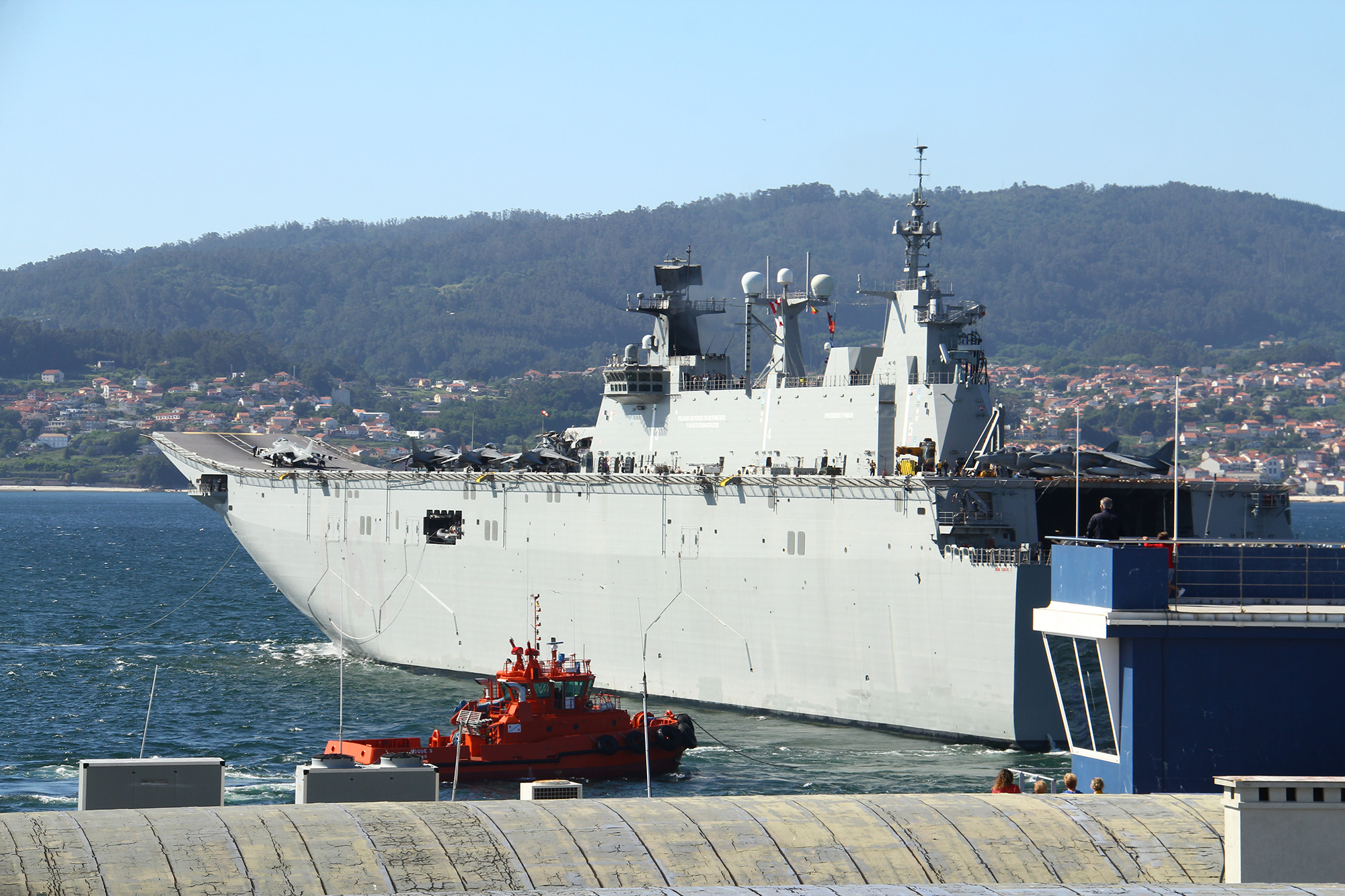
Spanish Juan Carlos I with Harrier II

Current

Juan Carlos I: a 27,000-tonne, specially designed multipurpose strategic projection ship which can operate as an amphibious assault ship and as an aircraft carrier. Juan Carlos I has full facilities for both functions including a ski jump for STOVL operations, is equipped with the AV-8B Harrier II attack aircraft. She also features a well deck and a vehicle storage area which can be used as additional hangar space. The vessel was launched in 2008 and commissioned on 30 September 2010.

=== Thailand ===
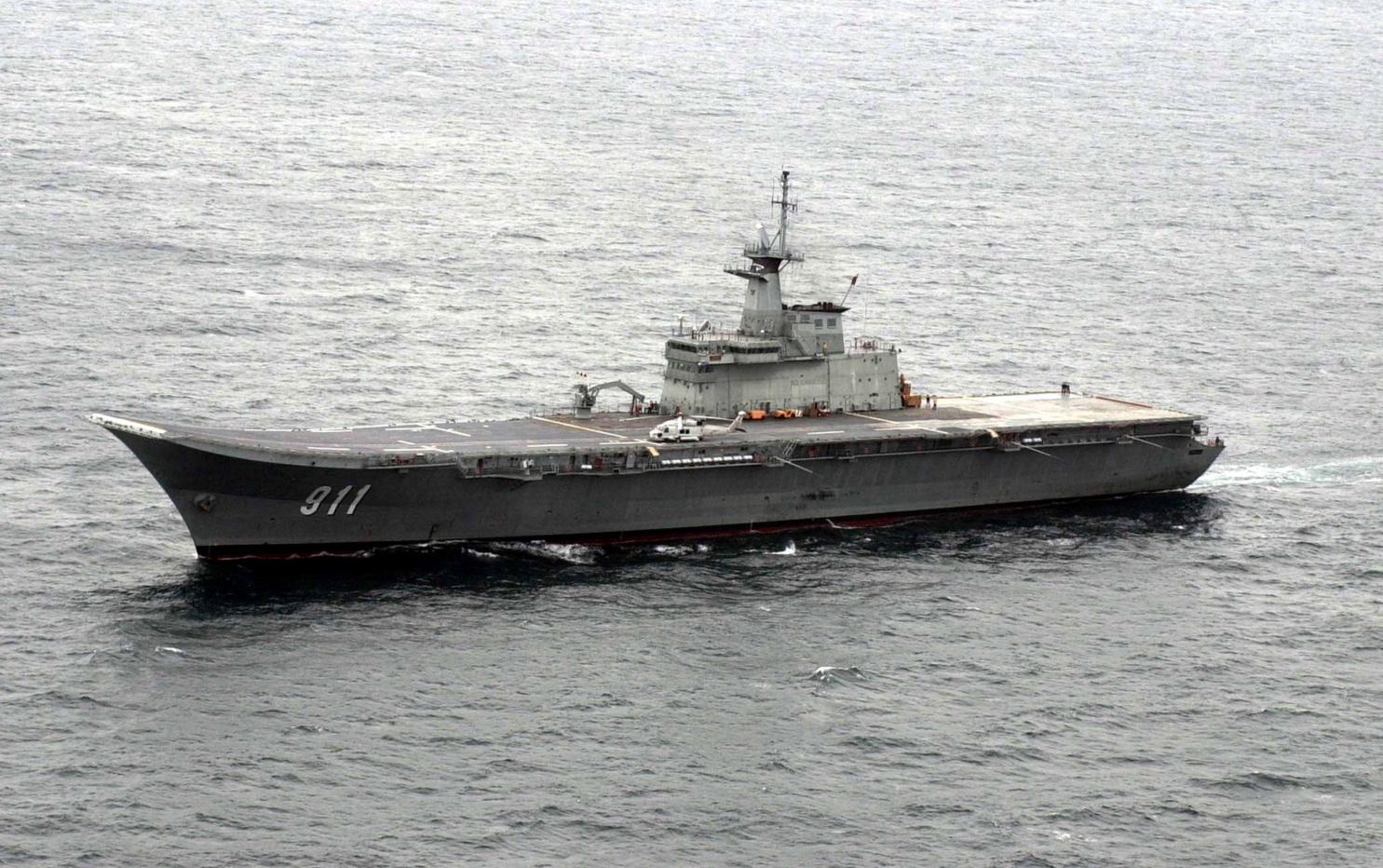
The aircraft carrier HTMS Chakri Naruebet of the Royal Thai Navy

Current

One offshore helicopter support ship: HTMS Chakri Naruebet helicopter carrier: 11,400-tonne STOVL carrier based on Spanish Príncipe de Asturias design. Commissioned in 1997. The AV-8S Matador/Harrier STOVL fighter wing, mostly inoperable by 1999, was retired from service without replacement in 2006. As of 2010, the ship is used for helicopter operations and for disaster relief.

=== Turkey ===
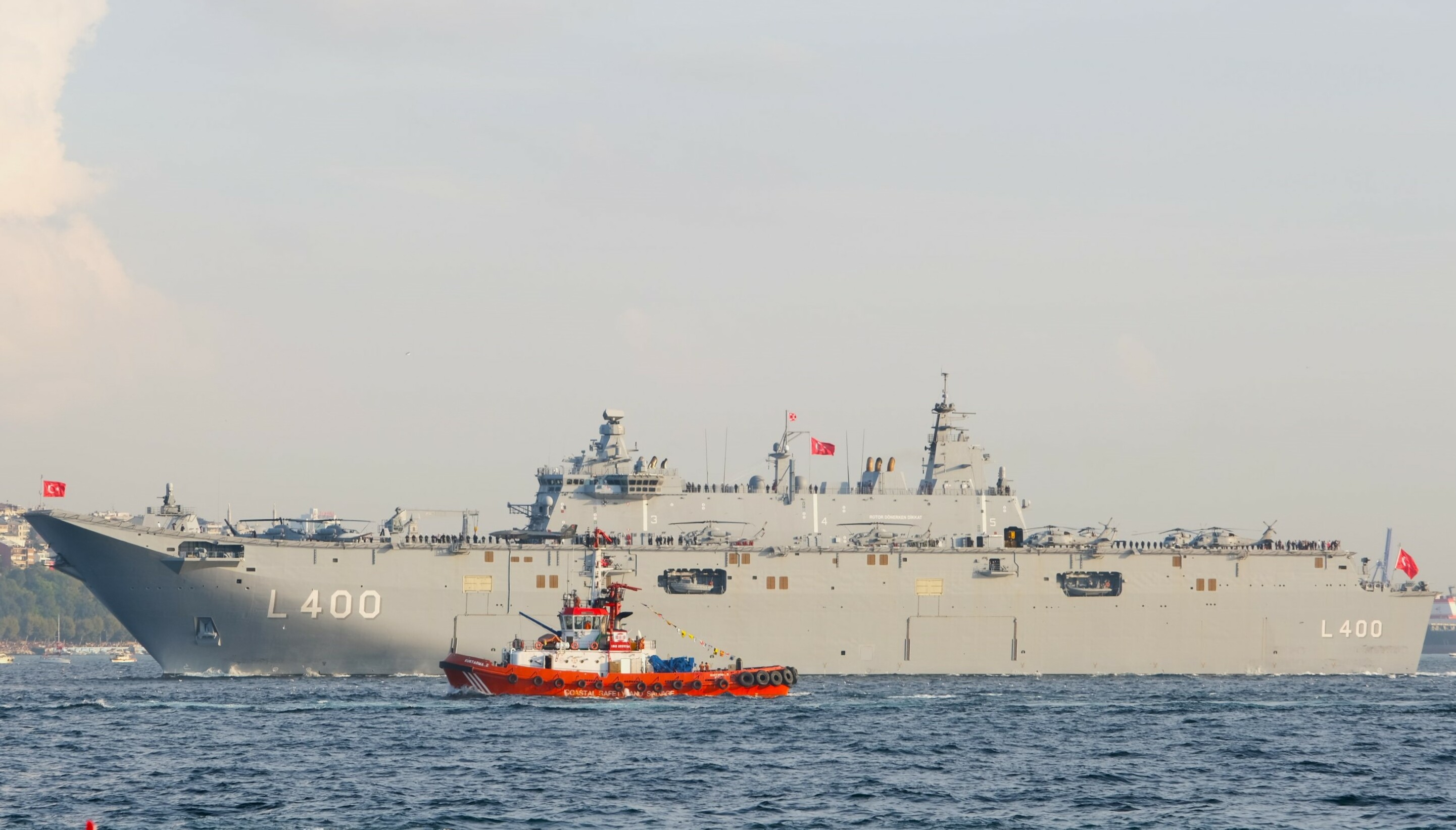
TCG Anadolu (L-400) at the Bosporus strait in Istanbul during the naval parade for celebrating the centenary of the Turkish Republic on 29 October 2023

Current

TCG Anadolu is a 27,079-tonne amphibious assault ship (LHD) (outfitted as drone carrier) of the Turkish Navy that can be configured as a 24,660-tonne V/STOL aircraft carrier. Construction began on 30 April 2016 by Sedef Shipbuilding Inc. at their Istanbul shipyard. TCG Anadolu was commissioned with a ceremony on 10 April 2023. The construction of a sister ship, to be named TCG Trakya, is currently being planned by the Turkish Navy.

The Sikorsky S-70B Seahawk and the Bell AH-1 SuperCobra are the two main types of helicopters used on TCG Anadolu, with the occasional use of CH-47F Chinook helicopters of the Turkish Army during military exercises and operations. The AH-1W Super Cobras will eventually be complemented and replaced by the TAI T929 ATAK 2.

The jet-powered, low-observable drone Bayraktar MIUS Kızılelma and the MALE UAV Bayraktar TB3 are two UCAVs that are specifically designed and manufactured by Baykar Technologies to be used on TCG Anadolu. The maiden flight of TAI Anka-3 (also part of Project MIUS), a jet-powered, flying wing type UCAV with stealth technology, was successfully completed on 28 December 2023.

On 19 November 2024, Baykar Bayraktar TB3 UCAV successfully took-off from the flight deck of TCG Anadolu and landed on the ship. It was the first time a fixed-wing unmanned aircraft of this size and class had successfully landed on a short-runway landing helicopter dock, without the use of an arresting gear.

Future

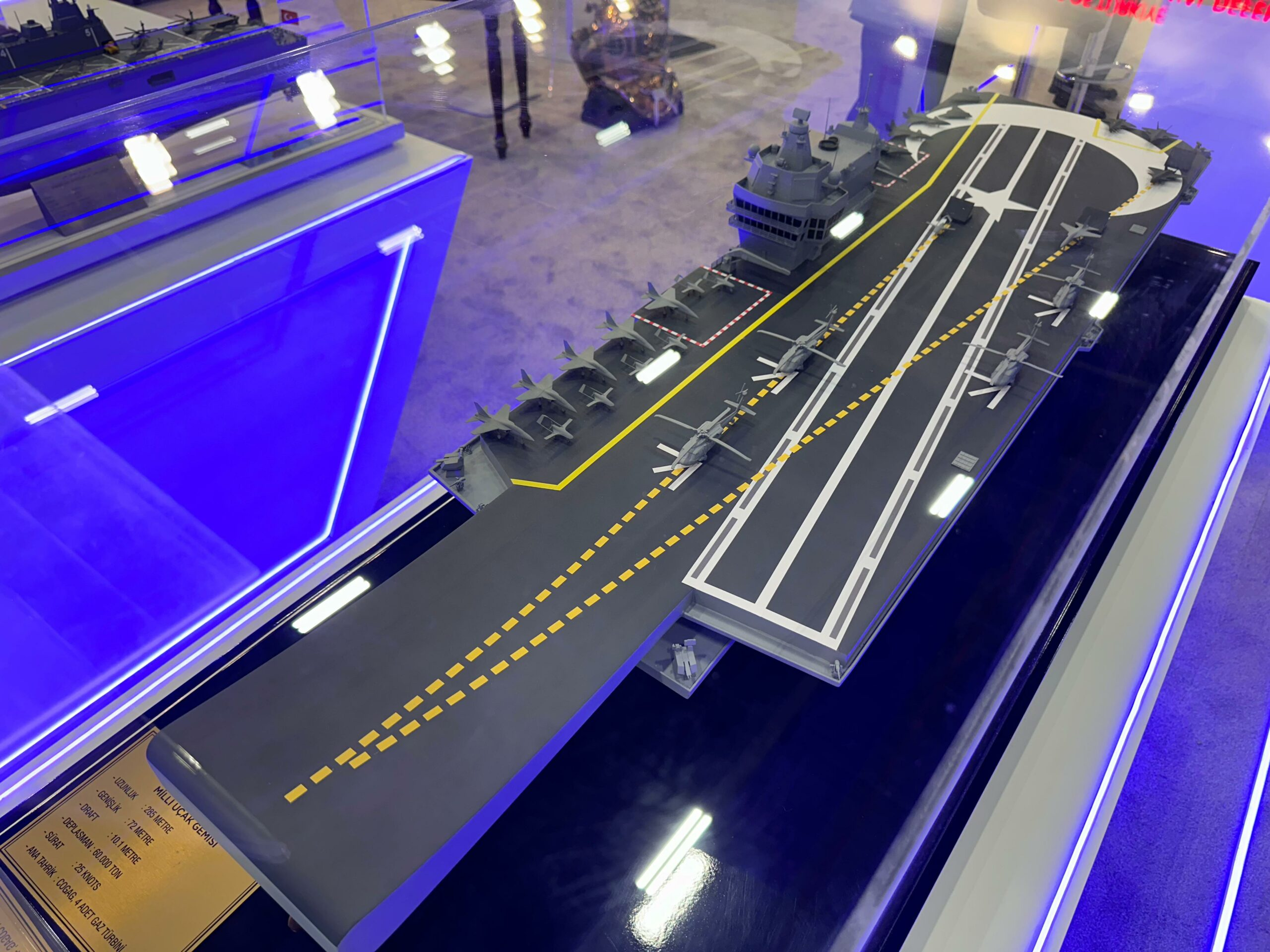
The construction of the first MUGEM-class aircraft carrier began at the Istanbul Naval Shipyard on 2 January 2025.

On 3 January 2024, the Turkish government approved the plan for the design and construction of a larger aircraft carrier, named the MUGEM-class.

On 15 February 2024, the Design and Projects Office of the Turkish Navy announced that it will be a STOBAR aircraft carrier with an overall length of 285 metres (935 ft), beam of 72 metres (236 ft), draught of 10.1 metres (33 ft), and displacement of 60,000 tons. It is to have a combined diesel–electric and gas (CODLAG) propulsion system and a maximum speed of more than 25 knots (29 mph; 46 km/h).

The construction of the first MUGEM-class aircraft carrier began on 2 January 2025. The first MUGEM-class aircraft carrier is being built at the Istanbul Naval Shipyard.

=== United Kingdom ===
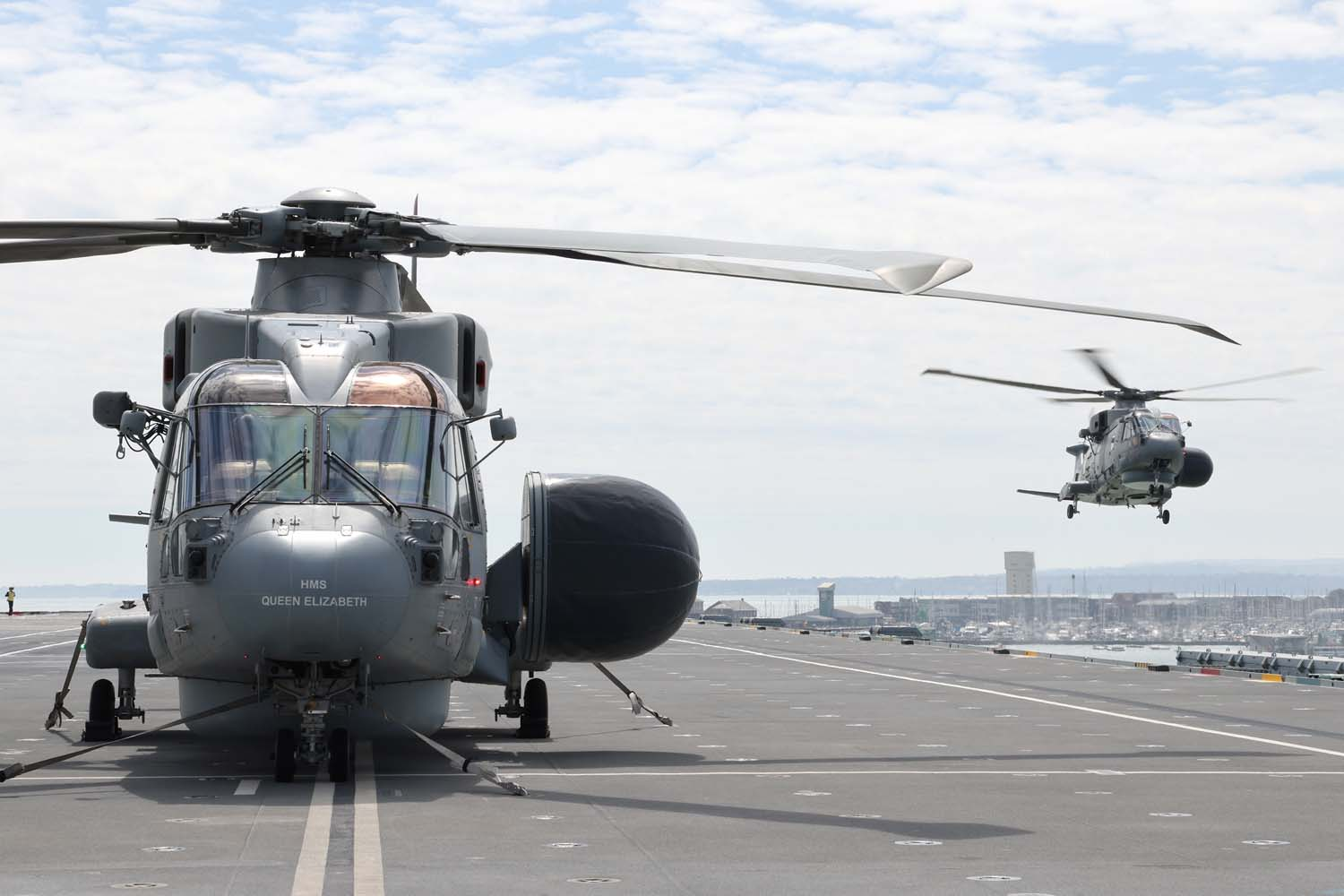
A Merlin HM2 AEW on HMS Queen Elizabeth's flight deck

Current

Two 80,600-tonne (est. full load) Queen Elizabeth-class STOVL carriers which operate the F-35 Lightning II. HMS Queen Elizabeth was commissioned in December 2017 and HMS Prince of Wales in December 2019.

Queen Elizabeth undertook her first operational deployment in 2021. Each Queen Elizabeth-class ship is able to operate around 40 aircraft during peacetime operations and is thought to be able to carry up to 72 at maximum capacity. As of the end of April 2020, 18 F-35B aircraft had been delivered to the Royal Navy and the Royal Air Force. "Full operating capability" for the UK's carrier strike capability had been planned for 2023 (two squadrons or 24 jets operating from one carrier). The longer-term aim remains for the ability to conduct a wide range of air operations and support amphibious operations worldwide from both carriers by 2026. They form the central part of the UK Carrier Strike Group. The Queen Elizabeth-class ships are expected to have service lives of 50 years.

=== United States ===
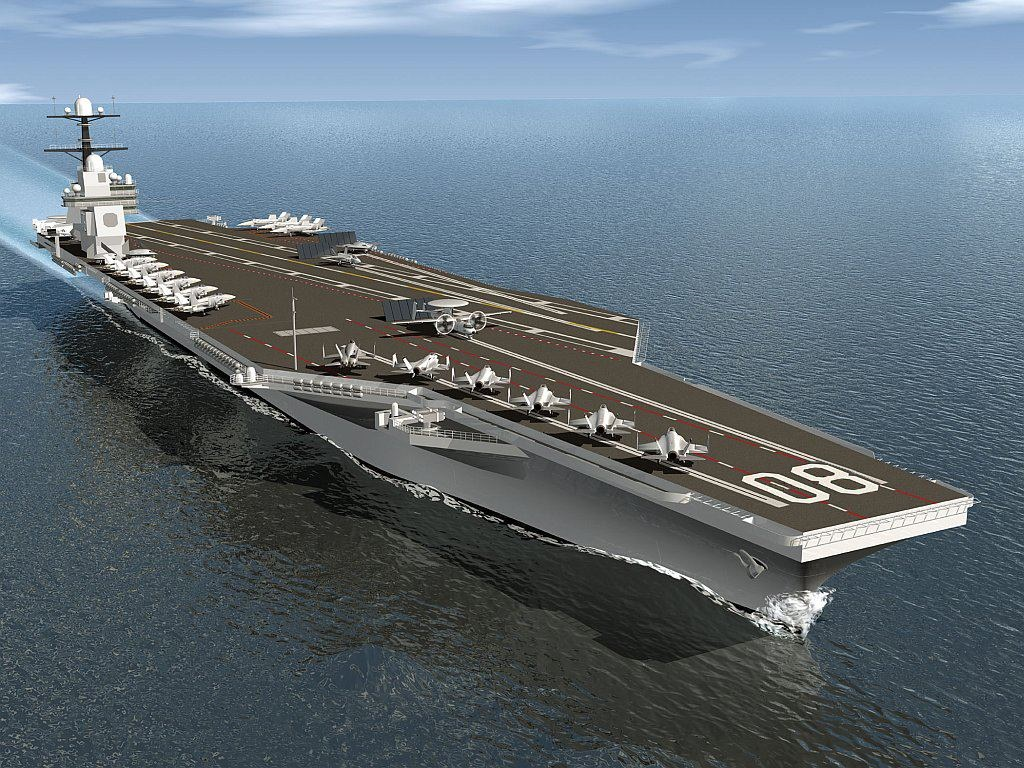
USS Enterprise (CVN-80), the third US Navy carrier to bear the name, is a Gerald R. Ford-class carrier under construction as of 2025 and is expected to enter service in 2028.

Current

Eleven CATOBAR carriers, all nuclear-powered:

- Nimitz class: ten 101,000-tonne, 333-meter-long (1,092 ft) fleet carriers, the first of which was commissioned in 1975. A Nimitz-class carrier is powered by two nuclear reactors providing steam to four steam turbines.
- Gerald R. Ford class, one 100,000-tonne, 337-meter-long (1,106 ft) fleet carrier. The lead of the class Gerald R. Ford came into service in 2017, with another nine planned to replace the aging Nimitz-class ships.

Nine amphibious assault ships carrying vehicles, Marine fighters, attack and transport helicopters, and landing craft with STOVL fighters for Close Air Support (CAS) and Combat Air Patrol (CAP):

- America class: a class of 45,000-tonne amphibious assault ships, although the first two ships in this class, (Flight 0) do not have well decks, all subsequent ships (Flight I) are to have well decks. Two ships are currently in service out of a planned 11 ships. Ships of this class can have a secondary mission as a light aircraft carrier with 20 AV-8B Harrier II, and in the future the F-35B Lightning II aircraft after unloading their Marine expeditionary unit.
- Wasp class: a class of 41,000-tonne amphibious assault ships, members of this class have been used in wartime in their secondary mission as light carriers with 20 to 25 AV-8Bs after unloading their Marine expeditionary unit. Seven ships currently in service of an original eight, with one lost to fire.

Future

The current US fleet of Nimitz-class carriers will be followed into service (and in some cases replaced) by the Gerald R. Ford class. It is expected that the ships will be more automated in an effort to reduce the amount of funding required to maintain and operate the vessels. The main new features are implementation of Electromagnetic Aircraft Launch System (EMALS) (which replaces the old steam catapults) and unmanned aerial vehicles. In terms of future carrier developments, Congress has discussed the possibility of accelerating the phasing-out of one or more Nimitz-class carriers, postponing or canceling the procurement of CVN-81 and CVN-82, or modifying the purchase contract.

Following the deactivation of USS Enterprise in December 2012, the US fleet comprised 10 fleet carriers, but that number increased back to 11 with the commissioning of Gerald R. Ford in July 2017. The House Armed Services Seapower subcommittee on 24 July 2007, recommended seven or eight new carriers (one every four years). However, the debate has deepened over budgeting for the $12–14.5 billion (plus $12 billion for development and research) for the 100,000-tonne Gerald R. Ford-class carrier (estimated service 2017) compared to the smaller $2 billion 45,000-tonne America-class amphibious assault ships, which are able to deploy squadrons of F-35Bs. The first of this class, USS America, is now in active service with another, USS Tripoli, and 9 more are planned.

In a report to Congress in February 2018, the Navy stated it intends to maintain a "12 CVN force" as part of its 30-year acquisition plan.

== Aircraft carriers in preservation ==
=== Current museum carriers ===
A few aircraft carriers have been preserved as museum ships. They are:

- USS Yorktown (CV-10) in Mount Pleasant, South Carolina
- USS Intrepid (CV-11) in New York City
- USS Hornet (CV-12) in Alameda, California
- USS Lexington (CV-16) in Corpus Christi, Texas
- USS Midway (CV-41) in San Diego, California
- Soviet aircraft carrier Kiev in Tianjin, China
- Soviet aircraft carrier Minsk in Nantong, China

=== Former museum carriers ===
- INS Vikrant (1961) was moored as a museum in Mumbai from 2001 to 2012, but was never able to find an industrial partner and was closed that year. She was scrapped in 2014.
- USS Cabot (CVL-28) was acquired for preservation by the Cabot Museum Foundation and moored in New Orleans from 1989 to 1997, but due to the Cabot Museum Foundation's failure to repay the U.S. Coast Guard over $1 million for removal of hazardous materials and fees associated with its docking, it was seized by the U.S. Marshals in 1999 and auctioned off to Sabe Marine Salvage. Scrapping of the ship began in November 2000.

=== Planned but cancelled museum carriers ===
- USS Tarawa (LHA-1) had a preservation campaign to bring her to the West Coast of the United States as the world's first amphibious assault ship museum. However, at RIMPAC 2024, on 9 July 2024, the Tarawa was sunk alongside USS Dubuque (LPD-8) as SINKEXs.

== Popular culture ==
Aircraft carriers are prominently portrayed in a number of Hollywood films including Midway (2019) and the carrier USS Nimitz is centrally featured in the science fiction film The Final Countdown (1980). The original film version about the Battle at Midway was made in England and titled Midway (1976). Aircraft carriers are prominently featured in both Top Gun and Top Gun: Maverick as providing the launch sites and mission operations support for the fighter operations seen in both films. The Japanese aircraft carriers involved in the attack on Pearl Harbor are featured in the 1970 film Tora! Tora! Tora! as well as the more recent film from 2001 Pearl Harbor. The carrier USS Ronald Reagan makes a cameo appearance at the end of the 2012 science fiction film Battleship. In the 2025 film Mission: Impossible – The Final Reckoning, the aircraft carrier USS George Bush is featured as delivering its special agent to a submarine rendezvous with the nuclear-powered USS Ohio in the Bering Straits by Alaska. The 50-minute documentary titled City of Steel: Carrier was released by the Discovery Channel in 2000 covering the final months of building and inspecting the USS Harry Truman through its commissioning by President Bill Clinton.

== See also ==
- Airborne aircraft carrier
- Aviation-capable naval vessel
- Carrier-based aircraft
- Drone carrier
- Lily and Clover
- Merchant aircraft carrier
- Mobile offshore base
- Project Habakkuk
- Seadrome
- Submarine aircraft carrier
- Unsinkable aircraft carrier

=== Related lists ===
See list of aircraft carriers in service for a summary of current carriers by country.

- List of active French Navy ships
- List of active Italian Navy ships
- List of active Spanish aircraft carriers
- List of aircraft carrier classes of the United States Navy
- List of aircraft carriers of the United States Navy
- List of escort carriers of the United States Navy
- List of aircraft carriers
- List of aircraft carriers by configuration
- List of aircraft carriers in service
- List of aircraft carriers of Germany
- List of aircraft carriers of Russia and the Soviet Union
- List of aircraft carriers of the Indian Navy
- List of aircraft carriers of the Imperial Japanese Navy (1868–1945)
- List of active Japan Maritime Self-Defense Force ships#Multi-role aircraft-carrying cruiser (de facto light aircraft carrier) - CVM
- List of aircraft carriers of the People's Liberation Army Navy (China)
- List of aircraft carriers of the Royal Navy
- List of escort carriers of the Royal Navy
- List of seaplane carriers of the Royal Navy
- List of aircraft carriers of World War II
- List of amphibious warfare ships
- List of carrier-based aircraft
- List of current ships of the Royal Canadian Navy
- List of sunken aircraft carriers
- List of nuclear-powered aircraft carriers

== Bibliography ==
- Friedman, Norman (1983). U.S. Aircraft Carriers: An Illustrated Design History. Naval Institute Press. ISBN 9780870217395. Archived from the original on 25 July 2020.
- Hobbs, David (2009). A Century of Carrier Aviation: The Evolution of Ships and Shipborne Aircraft. Barnsley, S Yorkshire: Seaforth Publishing. ISBN 978-1783466986. Archived from the original on 6 January 2022.
- Polak, Christian (2005). Sabre et Pinceau: Par d'autres Français au Japon. 1872–1960 (in French and Japanese). Hiroshi Ueki (植木 浩), Philippe Pons, foreword; 筆と刀・日本の中のもうひとつのフランス (1872–1960). éd. L'Harmattan.
- Sturtivant, Ray (1990). British Naval Aviation, The Fleet Air Arm, 1917–1990. London: Arm & Armour Press. ISBN 0-85368-938-5.
- Till, Geoffrey (1996). "Adopting the Aircraft Carrier: The British, Japanese, and American Case Studies". In Murray, Williamson; Millet, Allan R (eds.). Military Innovation in the Interwar Period. Cambridge University Press.
