= Soviet aircraft carrier Ulyanovsk =

Planned Soviet nuclear powered aircraft carrier

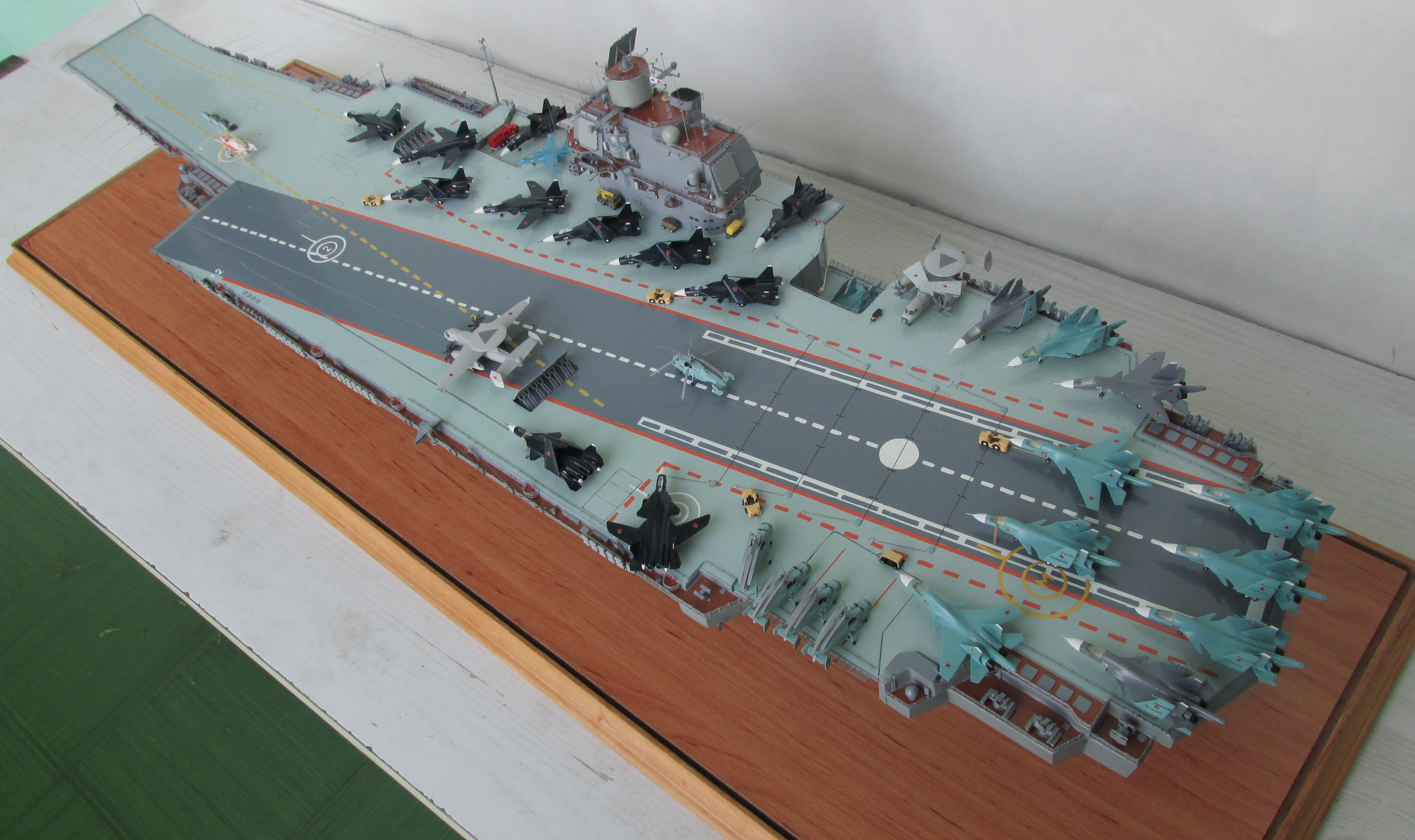
- Model of the Soviet nuclear-powered aircraft carrier Ulyanovsk

Class overview
- Name: Ulyanovsk class
- Builders: Chernomorsky Shipyard 444
- Operators: Soviet Navy
- Preceded by: Kuznetsov class
- Succeeded by: Project 23000
- Planned: 2
- Canceled: 2

History

Soviet Union
- Name: Ulyanovsk (Russian: Улья́новск)
- Ordered: 11 June 1986
- Laid down: 25 November 1988
- Commissioned: December 1995 (planned)
- Stricken: 1 November 1991
- Fate: Scrapped at 40% completion 5 February 1992

General characteristics
- Type: Aircraft carrier
- Displacement: 65,800 tons standard; 75,000 tons full load
- Length: 321.2 m (1,054 ft) overall
- Beam: 83.9 m (275 ft) overall; 40 m (130 ft) at waterline
- Draught: 10.6 m (35 ft)
- Propulsion: 4 × KN-3 nuclear reactors; 4 × steam turbines, four shafts, 280,000 shp (210,000 kW)
- Speed: 30 knots (56 km/h)
- Range: Unlimited distance; 20–25 years
- Endurance: Limited only by supplies
- Complement: 3,400 total
- Armament: 12 × P-700 Granit SSMs, 3S90 Uragan SAMs, 8 × CADS-N-1 CIWS, 8 × AK-630 rotary anti-aircraft cannons
- Aircraft carried: 68 aircraft total; 44 Sukhoi Su-33; and/or Mikoyan MiG-29K; 6 × Yak-44 radar picket aircraft; 16 Kamov Ka-27 ASW helicopters; 2 Kamov Ka-27PS SAR helicopters

Ulyanovsk (Russian: Улья́новск, IPA: [ʊˈlʲjanəfsk]), Soviet designation Project 1143.7, was a STOBAR aircraft carrier laid down at the now-defunct Black Sea Shipyard on 25 November 1988 as the first of a class of nuclear-powered supercarriers for the Soviet Navy. It was intended for the first ship to offer true blue water naval aviation capability for the Soviet Union, as the ship would have been equipped with two steam catapults that could launch heavier fixed-wing aircraft, representing a major advance over the comparatively smaller Kuznetsov class, which could only launch lighter/partly loaded aircraft via a bow ski-jump. However, construction of Ulyanovsk was stopped at about 40% due to the dissolution of the Soviet Union in 1991, and the unfinished hull was later scrapped in early 1992.

== History ==
=== Background ===
The Soviet Union's Nevsky Engineering Design Bureau developed the third-generation heavy aircraft cruiser Kuznetsov with Su-33 in the 1980s (Plan 1143.5/Order 105) and the Varyag aircraft carrier (Plan 1143.6/Order 106), at the same time, in December 1984, the construction of the fourth-generation large-scale nuclear-powered heavy aircraft cruiser began. The plan number was "Plan 1143.7", and the preliminary design was completed in 1986. On November 25, 1988, construction for "Order 107" ― named Ulyanovsk ― officially began at the Black Sea Shipyard.

To this end, the Soviet government allocated funds to carry out the second large-scale technical transformation of the Black Sea Shipyard, including:

- The construction of an assembly and welding workshop, allowing the hull to be increased in sections to 200 tons;
- A 350-ton self-propelled flatbed truck;
- A transport lane from the new workshop to the slipway;
- The length of No. 0 slipway was lengthened by 30 meters;
- A horizontal slipway-side platform with a total weight of 1,700 tons;
- Installing a slipway and slipway-side platform;
- Two new gantry cranes each with a lifting capacity of 900 tons, and other new cranes, bringing the number of cranes used on the entire slipway to ten;
- A river channel to ensure that the Ulyanovsk would be able to go to sea in the future.

=== Construction and cancellation ===
Ulyanovsk was laid down in 1988, but construction was cancelled due to the dissolution of the Soviet Union. The amount of funding to complete the carrier was insufficient, and the aircraft carrier construction plan was suspended. As of November 1991, Ulyanovsk was only 40% complete.

In accordance with Decree No. 69-R of February 4, 1992, signed by the First Deputy Prime Minister of Ukraine Kostyantyn Masyk, on February 5, 1992, scrapping of the ship's hull structures began. By October 29, 1992, the slipway was free, and the ship had been scrapped.

The No. 2 ship "Plan 1143.8" originally planned to be built was also cancelled at the same time.

== Design ==
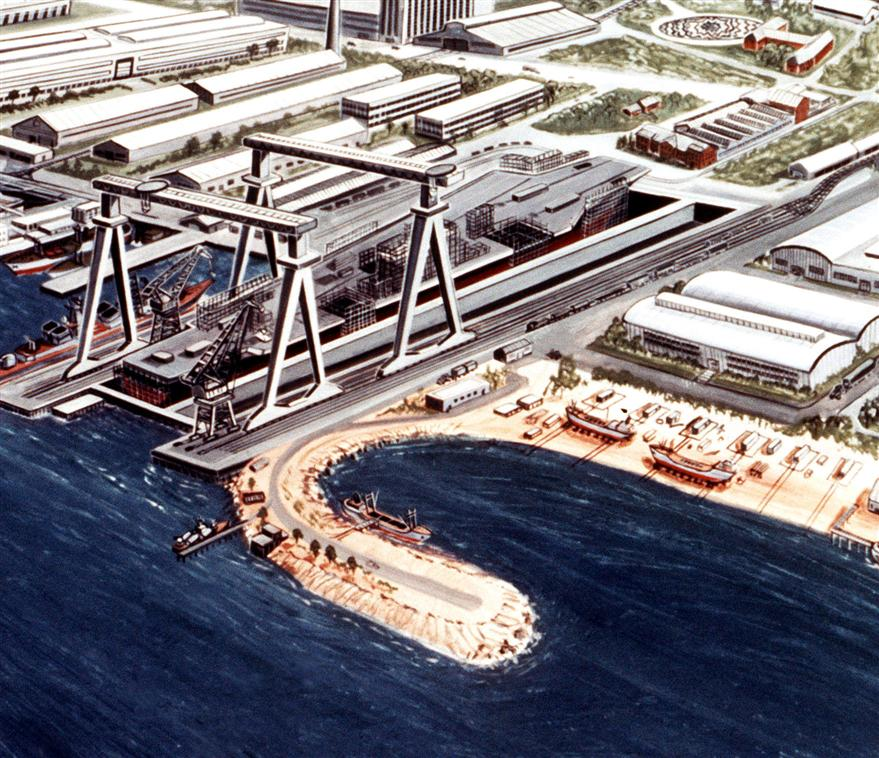
United States Department of Defense artwork of a Soviet nuclear-powered aircraft carrier similar to Ulyanovsk, under construction

Ulyanovsk was based upon the 1975 Project 1153 Orel, which did not get beyond blueprints. The initial commissioned name was to be Kremlin, but was later given the name Ulyanovsk after the Soviet city of Ulyanovsk, which was originally named Simbirsk but later renamed after Vladimir Lenin's original name because he was born there.

It would have been 85,000 tonnes in displacement (larger than the older Forrestal-class carriers but smaller than contemporary Nimitz class of the U.S. Navy). Ulyanovsk would have been able to launch the full range of fixed-wing carrier aircraft, as it was equipped with two catapults as well as a ski jump. The configuration would have been very similar to U.S. Navy carriers though with the typical Soviet practice of adding anti-ship missile (ASM) and surface-to-air missile (SAM) launchers. Its hull was laid down in 1988, but construction was cancelled at 40% complete in January 1991 and a planned second unit was never laid down.

== Air group ==
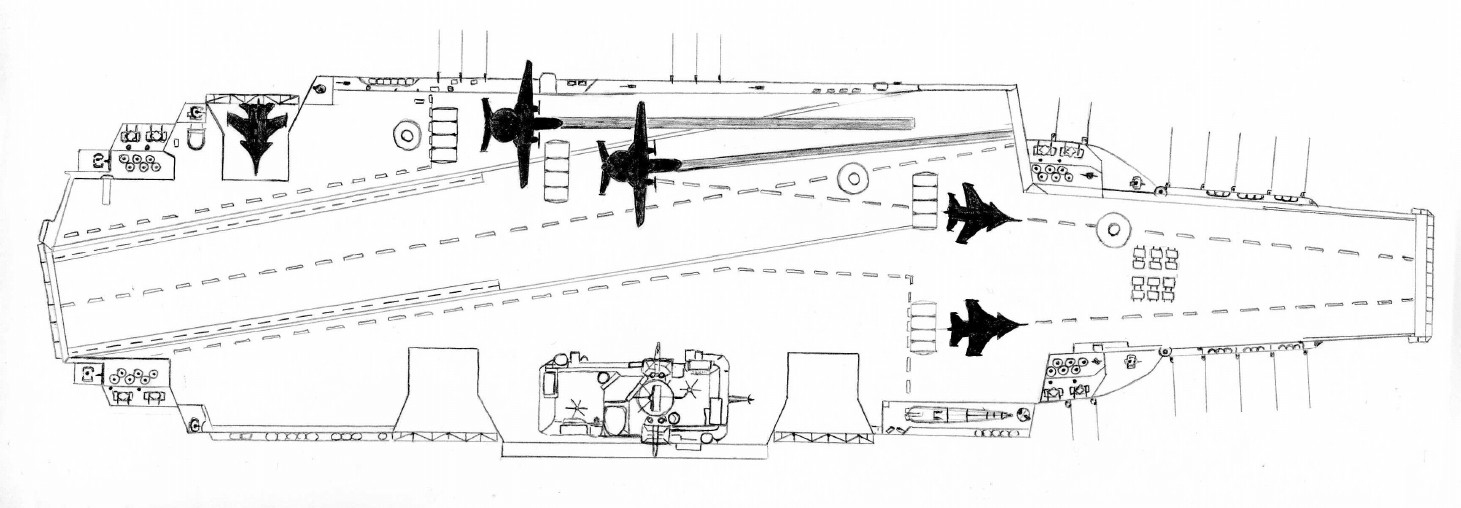
Yak-44 and Su-33 on the deck ATAKR Ulyanovsk

The Ulyanovsk air group was to include 68 aircraft with the following planned composition:

- 44 fighter aircraft, combination of Sukhoi Su-33 (Su-27K) and Mikoyan MiG-29K fighters, there is a possible chance of using Su-47s (as in replica model)
- 6 Yakovlev Yak-44 RLD airborne early warning aircraft
- 16 Kamov Ka-27 anti-submarine warfare helicopters
- 2 Ka-27PS air-sea rescue helicopters

The ship was to be equipped with two "Mayak" steam catapults made by the Proletarian Factory in Leningrad, a ski-jump, and four arresting gear. For storing aircraft, it was to have a 175×32×7.9-m hangar deck with aircraft elevated to the flight deck by three elevators with carrying capacities of 50 tons (two on the starboard side and one on the port). The stern was intended to house the "Luna" optical landing guidance system.

== See also ==
- List of ships of the Soviet Navy
- List of ships of Russia by project number
- Project 23000 aircraft carrier
