= List of Soviet aircraft carriers named Admiral Kuznetsov =

A ship class and an aircraft carrier have been named Admiral Kuznetsov after Nikolai Gerasimovich Kuznetsov (1904–1974), who was the People's Commissar of the Soviet Navy during World War II and later the Commander-in-Chief of the Soviet Navy.

- Kuznetsov-class aircraft carrier, a conventionally powered class of heavy aircraft carrying cruisers and the final class of Soviet aircraft carriers
- Soviet aircraft carrier Admiral Kuznetsov, a heavy aircraft carrying cruiser commissioned in 1991, and currently serving as the flagship of the Russian Navy.
