= Project 23000 aircraft carrier =

Russian supercarrier proposal

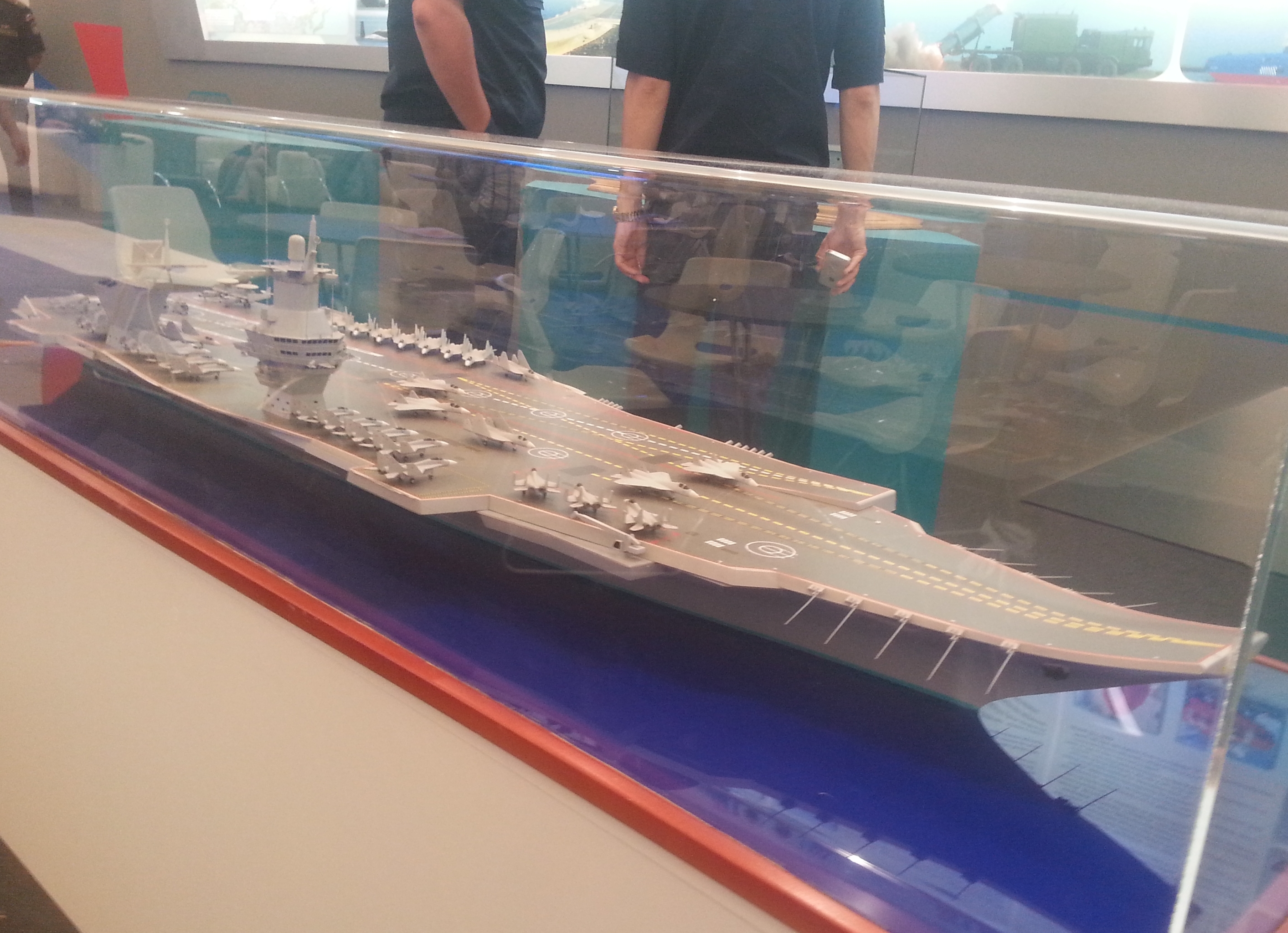
- A model of Project 23000E at the international military-technical forum Army-2015.

Class overview
- Name: Shtorm class
- Builders: Unknown
- Operators: Russian Navy (planned)
- Preceded by: Kuznetsov class; Ulyanovsk class
- Cost: ~US$5.5 billion (for export version)

General characteristics
- Type: Aircraft carrier
- Displacement: 90,000–100,000 tons
- Length: 330.1 m (1,083 ft)
- Beam: 40 m (131 ft) (waterline)
- Draught: 11 m (36 ft)
- Installed power: Nuclear reactor RITM-200 or RITM-400
- Propulsion: 4 × propellers
- Speed: 25–30 kn (46–56 km/h; 29–35 mph)
- Sensors & processing systems: Integrated sensors, including: Multifunction phased array radar; Electronic warfare system; Communications suite
- Armament: Four anti-aircraft systems (unspecified) possibly S-400 missile system
- Aircraft carried: Up to 100; Sukhoi Su-57; Mikoyan MiG-29K
- Aviation facilities: Angled flight deck, with four launching positions (two on the ski-jump ramp and two electromagnetic catapults); One set of arresting gear
- Notes: Dual island design

Project 23000 or Shtorm (Russian: Шторм, lit. 'Storm') is a proposal for an aircraft carrier designed by the Krylov State Research Center for the Russian Navy. The cost of the export version (Project 23000E) has been put at over US$5.5 billion, and as of 2017, development had been expected to take ten years. As of 2026, the project had not yet been approved and, given the financial costs, it was unclear whether it would be made a priority over other elements of Russian naval modernization leaving the Russian Navy without an operational aircraft carrier.

== History ==
The carrier is being considered for service with the Russian Navy's Northern Fleet as a replacement for aircraft carrier (heavy aircraft cruiser in Russian classification) Admiral Kuznetsov which was commissioned in 1991. The Nevskoye Design Bureau is also reported to be taking part in the development project. Although the creation of a new aircraft carrier, along with the Lider-class destroyers, has been postponed by Russian president Vladimir Putin, it is still mentioned in the Russia's State Armament Programme for 2018–2027 released in May 2017. According to Russian officials, a new heavy aircraft carrier should be laid down between 2025 and 2030. In 2020, it was reported that, if built, the carrier might also be fitted with the proposed S-500 surface-to-air missiles.

In early July 2016, the design of the aircraft carrier was offered to India for purchase.

== See also ==
- List of active Russian Navy ships
- List of ships of Russia by project number
