= CTOL =

Aircraft takeoff and landing using conventional runways

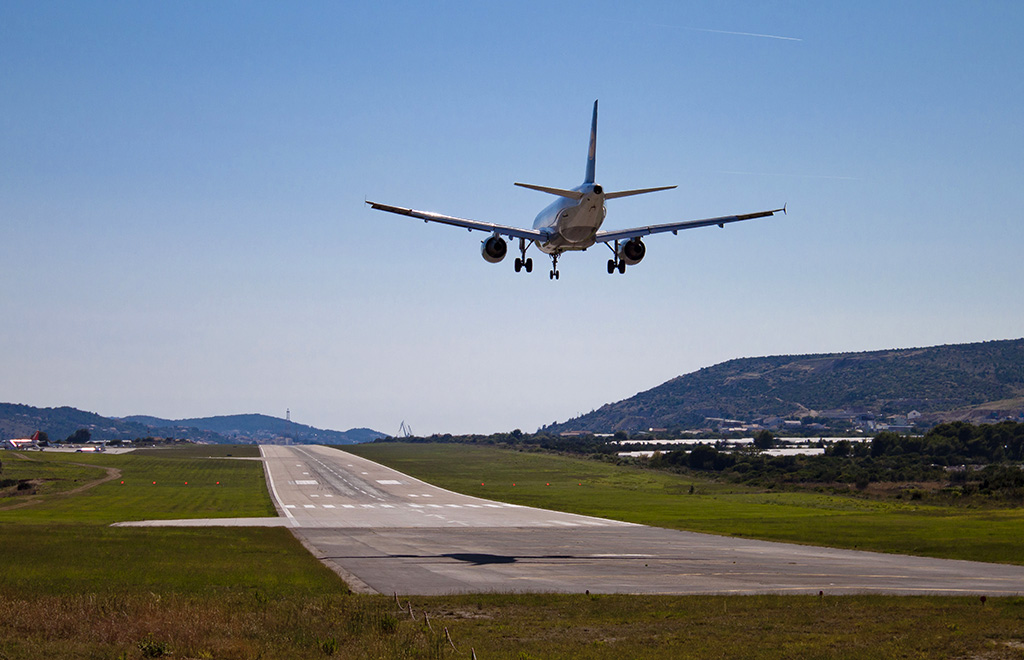
A jetliner approaching a runway for conventional landing

A conventional take-off and landing (CTOL), also known as horizontal take-off and landing (HTOL), is the usual process whereby fixed-wing aircraft perform takeoff and landing. As fixed-wing aircraft must have a forward motion to have relative air flow over the airfoils (wings) in order to generate lift, they require a period of ground acceleration before takeoff and conversely also a period of safe, gradual ground deceleration after landing, both translating to the necessity of sufficient distance for linear ground movement, which conventionally involve the use of dedicated runways.

Seaplanes and amphibious aircraft, instead of using runways, take off and land directly on surface of waterbodies using pontoons. For ease of air traffic control and safety considerations, they are often directed to perform takeoff and landing in designated stretches of open waterways near water aerodromes, away from docks, marinas and busy shipping lanes where accidental collision with watercraft and structures may occur.

== Conventional takeoff ==
An Airbus A300 taking off from Portland International Airport

During takeoff, the aircraft will first taxi or be tugged into a launch position at one end of the runway, where a final preflight check known as the run-up is completed. When cleared to proceed, the aircraft engines power up and the aircraft, propelled by engine thrust, begins accelerating down the runway in a takeoff roll with its landing gear wheels still contacting the ground.

The takeoff roll ends when sufficient speed has been reached for the wings to generate more lift than the combined weight of the aircraft and its payloads, at which point the pilot manipulates the flight controls to pitch up the aircraft and raise the angle of attack of the wings, which further increases their lift coefficient and causes the aircraft to finally break contact with the ground (i.e. the liftoff) and transition into actual flight.

== Conventional landing ==
An McDonnell Douglas MD-11 landing at Portland Airport

During landing, the aircraft will start approaching flight towards the runway at a steady airspeed and altitude, sometimes in holding, while communicating with air traffic control and waiting for approval to land. Once confirmed safe to approach, the aircraft begins its descent in final approach towards the airport/airfield, lining up with the runway using visual approach or guided by instrument landing system. The aircraft will also decelerate using air brakes to a minimum steady flight speed, while pitching up in a flare until the landing gears contact the runway in a relatively dampened touchdown. Until all the landing gears contact the runway and the aircraft stabilized safely into its normal horizontal posture, its engine will stay powered up in case of unplanned circumstances where a touch-and-go re-takeoff needs to be performed.

Once the touchdown is secured, the engines power down and the aircraft coasts along the runway in a decelerating rollout until it slows down to the taxiing speed and then exits the runway into a taxiway and/or apron.

== See also ==
- Takeoff and landing
  - Short takeoff and landing (STOL)
  - Vertical takeoff and landing (VTOL)
  - Short takeoff and vertical landing (STOVL)
  - Vertical and/or short takeoff and landing (V/STOL)
- Assisted takeoff
  - Aircraft catapult
  - Jet-assisted takeoff
- Ski-jump
- Arresting gear and tailhook
  - Catapult-assisted takeoff but arrested recovery (CATOBAR)
  - Short takeoff but arrested recovery (STOBAR)
- Index of aviation articles
