= Soviet aircraft carrier Baku =

Soviet and Russian aircraft carrier

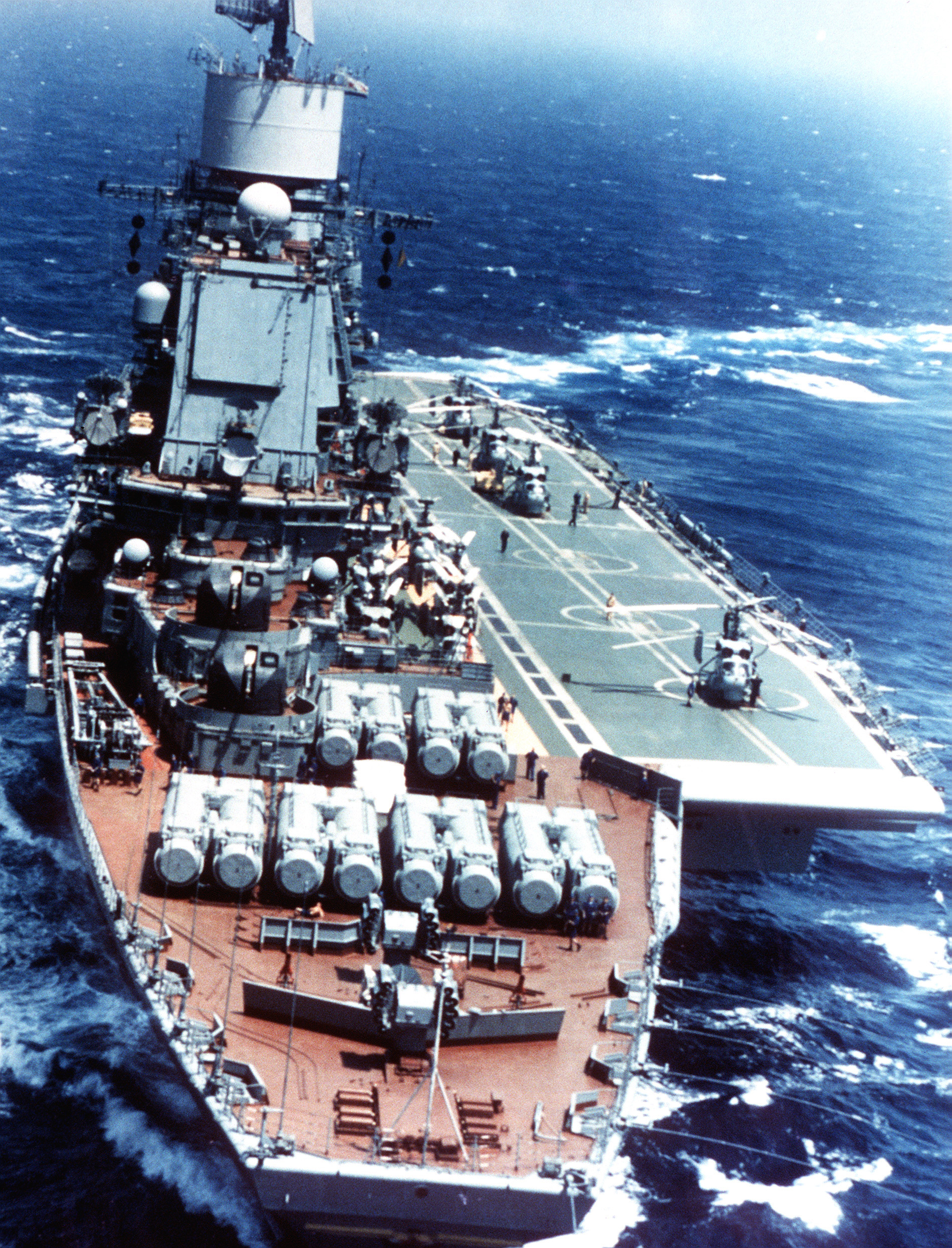
- Baku underway off the coast of southern Italy, c. 1988

History

→ Soviet Union → Russia
- Name: Baku (Russian: Баку)
- Namesake: City of Baku
- Renamed: Admiral Flota Sovetskogo Soyuza Gorshkov (Russian: Адмирал Флота Советского Союза Горшков)
- Namesake: Sergey Gorshkov
- Builder: Chernomorskiy Yard, Nikolayev
- Laid down: 17 February 1978
- Launched: 1 April 1982
- Commissioned: 11 December 1987
- Decommissioned: 1996
- Fate: Sold to India as INS Vikramaditya on 20 January 2004

General characteristics
- Class & type: Kiev-class aircraft cruiser
- Displacement: 33,440 tons (standard); 44,490 tons (loaded)
- Length: 273 m (896 ft)
- Beam: 51.9 m (170 ft) o/a; 31 m (102 ft) w/l
- Draught: 9.42 m (30.9 ft)
- Propulsion: 4 shaft geared steam turbines, 200,000 shp
- Speed: 32 kn (59 km/h; 37 mph)
- Endurance: 13,500 nmi (25,000 km; 15,500 mi) at 18 kn (33 km/h; 21 mph)
- Armament: 6 × twin SS-N-12 'Sandbox' SSM launchers (12 missiles) 24 × 8-cell SA-N-9 vertical SAM launchers (192 missiles) 2 × AK-100 (naval gun) 100 mm guns 8 × AK-630 30 mm CIWS 10 × 533 mm torpedo tubes 2 × RBU-12000 anti-submarine rocket launchers
- Aircraft carried: 12 Yak-38M fighter aircraft; 20 Kamov Ka-25 or Kamov Ka-27 helicopters

Baku (Russian: Баку) was a Kiev-class aircraft carrier (Note: a heavy aircraft cruiser in Russian classification) (Note: Due to restrictions imposed by the Montreux Convention limiting the tonnage of aircraft carriers traveling through the Bosporus, all Soviet and Russian aircraft carriers are named as aircraft carrying cruisers. In the case of Admiral Gorshkov, this accurately reflects the ship's mission and weapons fit.) of the Soviet Navy and the Russian Navy from 1987 to 1996. In 1991 the ship was renamed Admiral Flota Sovetskogo Soyuza Gorshkov (Russian: Адмира́л фло́та Сове́тского Сою́за Горшков "Admiral of the Fleet of the Soviet Union Gorshkov") in Russian service.

Baku is considered a separate class due to her improvements including a phased array radar, extensive electronic warfare installations, and an enlarged command and control suite. She was launched in 1982, and was in service from 1987 to 1991 in the Soviet Navy as Baku, and from 1991 to 1996 in the Russian Navy as Admiral Gorshkov.

In 2004, Gorshkov was sold to India with extensive conversion and entered service as the new aircraft carrier INS Vikramaditya.

== History ==
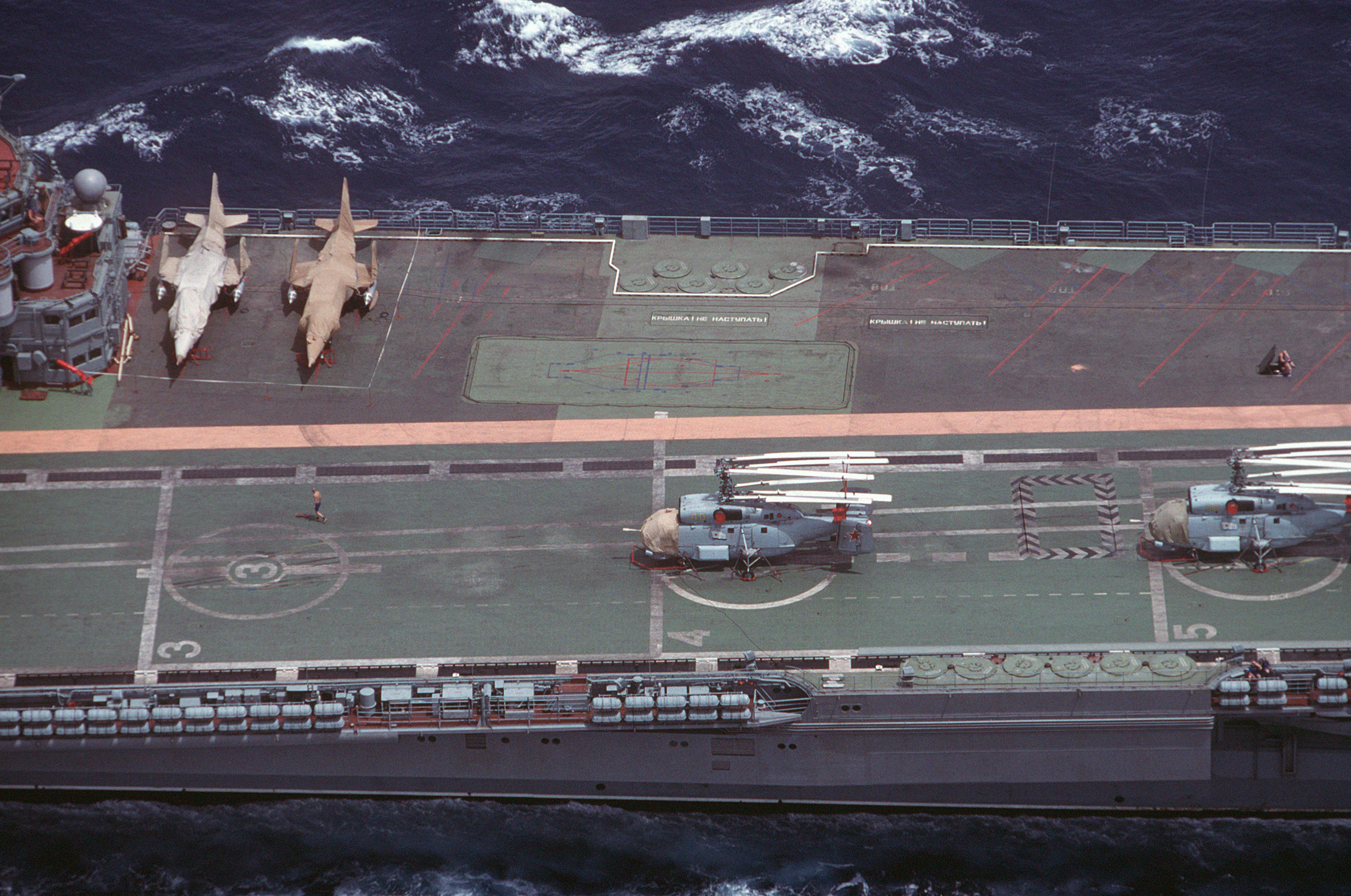
Yakovlev Yak-38 Forger aircraft and Kamov Ka-27 Helix helicopters aboard Baku in 1988.

The ship was laid down in 1978 at Nikolayev South (Shipyard No.444) in Ukraine, launched in 1982, and commissioned in December 1987. The delay in commissioning was largely caused by software bugs in the new command and control system. The ship was renamed Admiral Flota Sovetskogo Soyuza Gorshkov on 4 January 1990. Sergey Gorshkov was responsible for the expansion of the Soviet Navy during the Cold War.

Baku served with the Northern Fleet. She deployed to the Mediterranean from July to December 1988, and in 1989 and 1990 took part in amphibious landing exercises in the Baltic. In September 1991 she hosted the first shipboard landings of the Yakovlev Yak-141.

In February 1992 the ship was taken out of the ready forces with worn-out boilers and steam lines and laid up at a repair yard near Murmansk, where a steam line rupture killed six men in February 1994. Repairs were never funded and she was offered for sale; an Indian Navy delegation inspected her in September 1995.

On 20 January 2004, Russia agreed to sell Admiral Gorshkov to India after an extensive upgrade at Sevmash Enterprise. In December 2009, it was reported that India had agreed to pay a price of US$2.3 billion. The carrier, now named INS Vikramaditya, was commissioned into the Indian Navy on 16 November 2013.

== Design ==
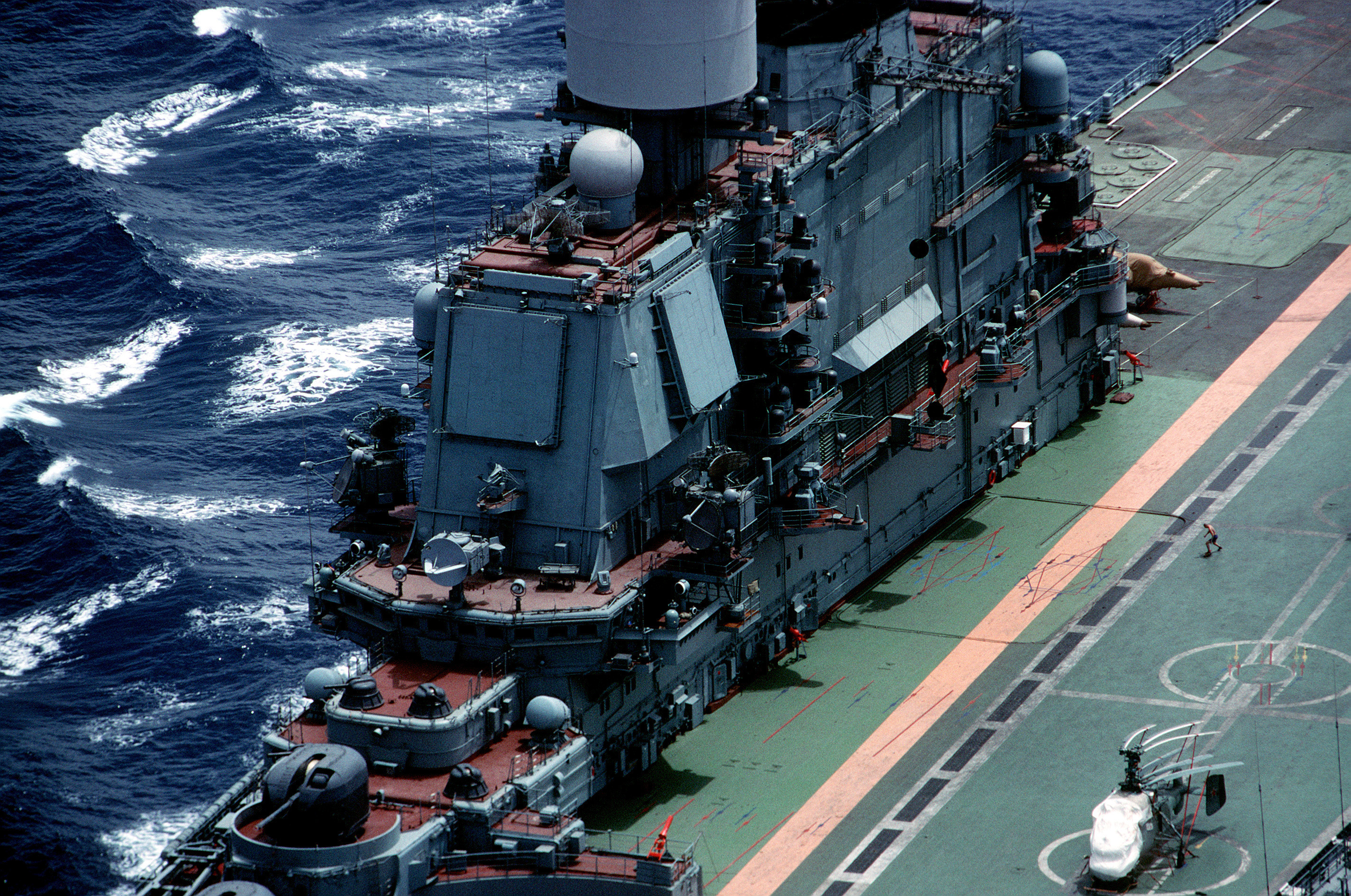
View of Baku's island superstructure, showing the Mars-Passat (NATO reporting name "Sky Watch") phased array radar scanners

The fourth of the Project 1143 aircraft carrying cruisers, Baku had many differences from the rest of the class, trialing technologies to be used on the Admiral Kuznetsov. The most obvious is the massive passive electronically scanned array above the bridge. This was the phased array antenna for the Mars-Passat ("Sky Watch") 3D air search radar. Sky Watch proved troublesome and was probably never operational.

The biggest change to the weapon systems was the replacement of the 4K60 (SA-N-3 'Goblet') and 9K33 Osa (SA-N-4 'Gecko') SAM launchers with four SA-N-9 'Gauntlet' VLS launchers. This allowed room for another two 4K80 (SS-N-12 'Sandbox') launchers. The two AA guns of the Kievs were replaced with 100 mm guns, and the SUW-N-1 launcher was removed.

The air wing was the same as the other Kievs, consisting of a squadron of twelve Yakovlev Yak-38 ('Forger') V/STOL strike fighter aircraft (until they were retired in 1992), twelve Kamov Ka-27 ('Helix-A') ASW/SAR helicopters and two Ka-31 ('Helix') airborne early warning helicopters. Flight operations were assisted by the distinctive new "Cake Stand" tactical air navigation system.
