= Chinese aircraft carrier Shandong =

Chinese aircraft carrier

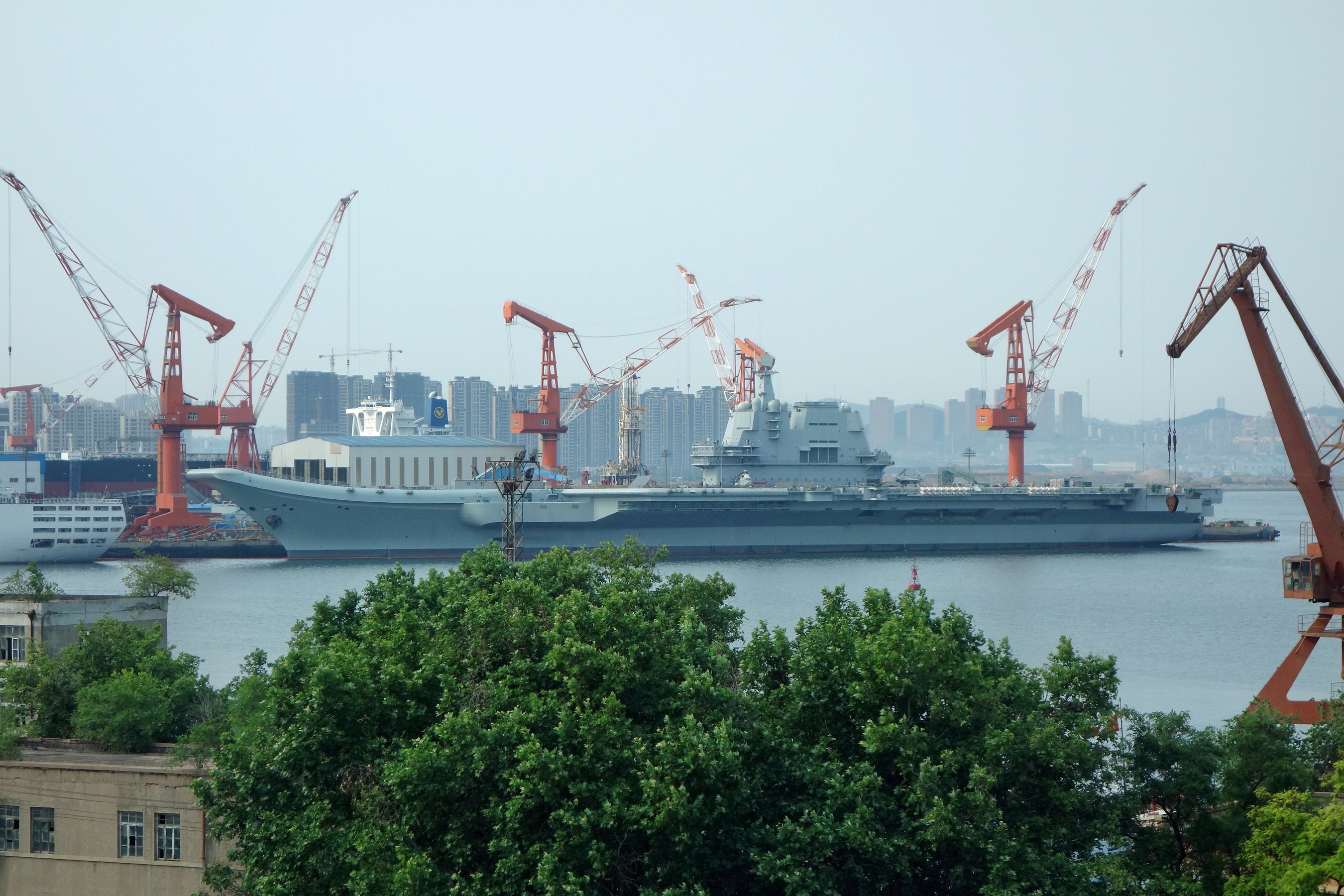
- The aircraft carrier Shandong docked at Dalian in 2019 prior to commissioning

Class overview
- Builders: Dalian Shipbuilding Industry
- Operators: People's Liberation Army Navy
- Preceded by: Type 001 Liaoning
- Succeeded by: Type 003 Fujian
- Completed: 1

History

China
- Name: Shandong; (Chinese: 山东舰)
- Namesake: Shandong province
- Builder: Dalian Shipbuilding Industry
- Laid down: March 2013
- Launched: 26 April 2017
- Completed: 25 April 2018
- Commissioned: 17 December 2019
- Motto: (Simplified Chinese: 忠诚，勇毅，精武，制胜)：Loyalty, Perseverance, Readiness, Victory
- Status: In active service

General characteristics
- Class & type: Type 002 (variant of Kuznetsov-class aircraft carrier)
- Type: STOBAR Aircraft carrier
- Displacement: 60,000 to 70,000 tons, full load
- Length: 305 m (1,000 ft 8 in)
- Beam: 75 m (246 ft 1 in)
- Propulsion: Conventional steam turbines, 4 shafts
- Speed: 31 knots (57 km/h; 36 mph)
- Sensors & processing systems: (Type 346 radar) Type 346A S-band AESA; Type 382 radar
- Armament: 3 × Type 1130 CIWS; 3 × HQ-10 (18-cell missile system)
- Aircraft carried: 40+ fixed-wing and rotary-wing aircraft including: 36 Shenyang J-15; 4 Changhe Z-18; 2 Harbin Z-9

Shandong (17; Chinese: 山东舰; pinyin: Shāndōng Jiàn) is a Chinese aircraft carrier that was launched on 26 April 2017 for the People's Liberation Army Navy (PLAN) of the People's Republic of China. She is the country's first domestically built aircraft carrier and second in PLAN service after the completion and commissioning of Liaoning, from which she is derived. Shandong's class was initially suspected to be designated Type 001A (as Liaoning received the designation Type 001) but was revealed to be Type 002 at her commissioning ceremony. The class received the NATO reporting name Kuznetsov Mod. ("modified"), since the design of the ship is a modified version of and similar to the Kuznetsov-class aircraft carrier originally made for the Soviet Navy.

== History ==
=== Construction ===
Shandong was constructed by the Dalian Shipbuilding Industry, part of the China Shipbuilding Industry Corporation, in Dalian, Liaoning province, China. According to the state Xinhua News Agency, manufacture began in November 2013 and laid down the keel for its hull in a dry dock beginning in March 2015.

The Chinese government did not publicly confirm the ship's existence until construction was well under way. Satellite imagery for the defense analysis industry showed the aircraft carrier in the early stages of hull assembly by March 2015. Public photos of a hull with military characteristics at the Dalian shipyard surfaced on the internet the next month. In October 2015, the first definitive signs of the vessel's role appeared when construction of a hangar deck began on the hull. In December 2015, a Chinese defense ministry spokesman confirmed that the ship was an aircraft carrier, stating that the design and construction work was under way.

In May 2016, the ski-jump takeoff ramp was noted to be close to installation. The ship's island superstructure was fabricated in two parts: the nine-deck forward half, containing the bridge and main mast, was installed by September of that year; the aft half, with the funnel and air intakes, was installed in the weeks that followed. By the end of 2016, the ship was substantially structurally complete.

=== Outfitting ===
Following the launch, the carrier was fitted-out and underwent early tests of the propulsion system. The dockside system trials began after the out-fitting was completed in November 2017.

At the time of her launch, the ship was not expected to be delivered to PLAN until 2020; however, successful early tests put the project ahead of schedule and media reports indicated that she could enter the navy fleet in 2019. While her predecessor CNS Liaoning has been used largely as a training ship since she entered active service in 2012, the Type 002 is expected to be used in regular military operational service.

=== Sea trials ===
The first sea trial of the carrier took place in May 2018 in the Bohai Sea. This was followed by eight more trials through November 2019 for a total of about 19 months before the carrier was commissioned. The ninth and final sea trial, which commenced from 14 November 2019, was conducted simultaneously with a training exercise in South China Sea. The dates and durations of the sea trials are as follow:

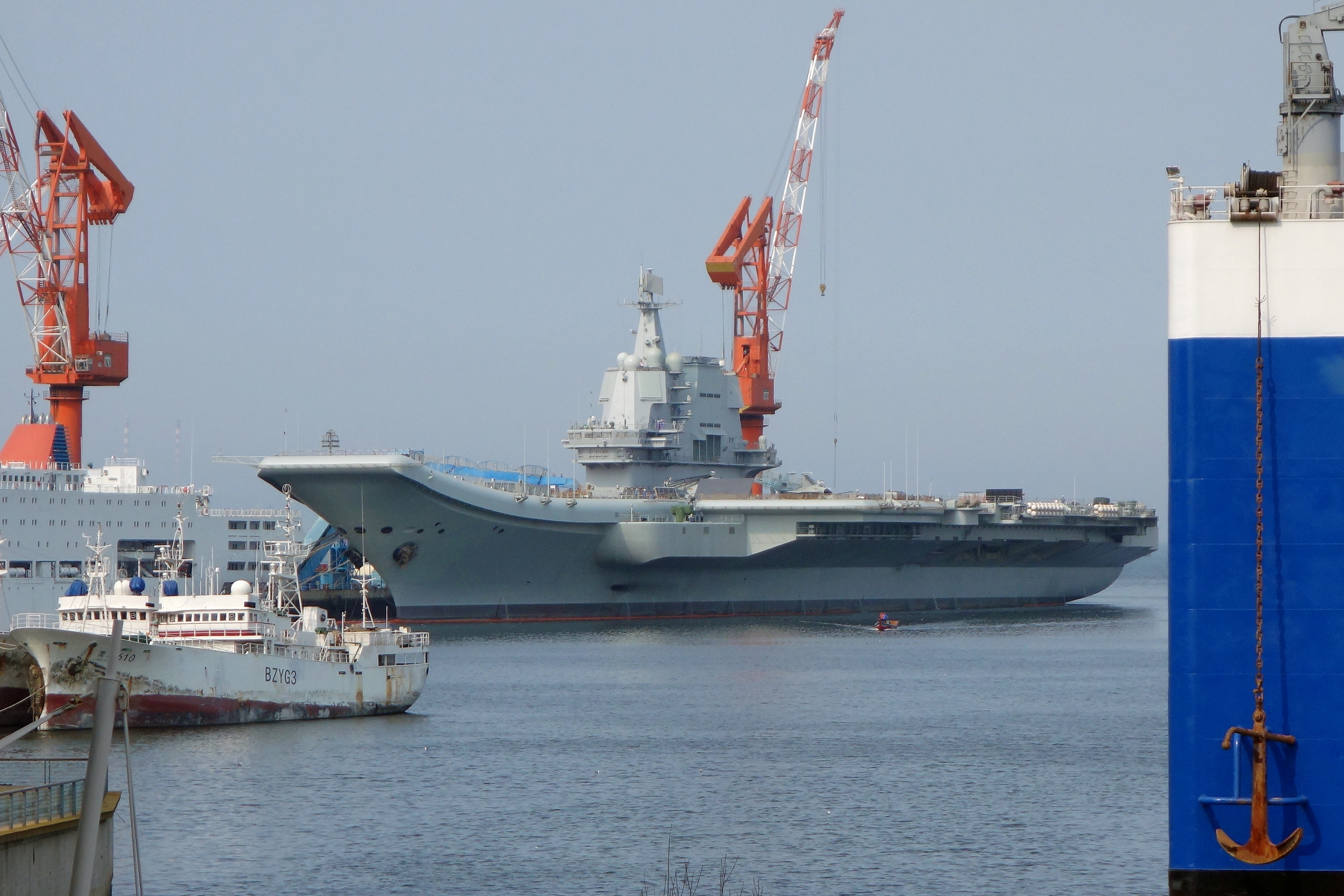
Shandong in 2019

- First sea trial: 13–18 May 2018
- Second sea trial: 26 August – 4 September 2018
- Third sea trial: 28 October – 6 November 2018
- Fourth sea trial: 27 December 2018 – 8 January 2019
- Fifth sea trial: 27 February – 4 March 2019
- Sixth sea trial: 25–31 May 2019
- Seventh sea trial: 1–4 August 2019 and 6–22 August 2019
- Eighth sea trial: 15–20 October 2019
- Ninth sea trial: from 14 November 2019 (end date unknown)

The arresting gear was installed on 11 September 2018 after the second sea trial. This was immediately followed by flight tests of the J-15, Z-18 and Z-9 on 14 September 2018. J-15D, the electronic warfare (EW) version of the aircraft, was also spotted on deck on 9 October 2018.

=== Commissioning ===
The carrier was commissioned on 17 December 2019 at Sanya, Hainan by Central Military Commission chairman Xi Jinping and was officially named Shandong. After commissioning, according to Chinese media Shandong reached in October 2020 initial operating capability (IOC) or basic standards for deployment, which her predecessor Liaoning only attained six years after commissioning, in 2018. Lai Yijun, a senior captain who previously commanded PLAN frigate Lianyungang, was the captain of Shandong at commissioning.

=== Military exercises ===
==== 2023 ====
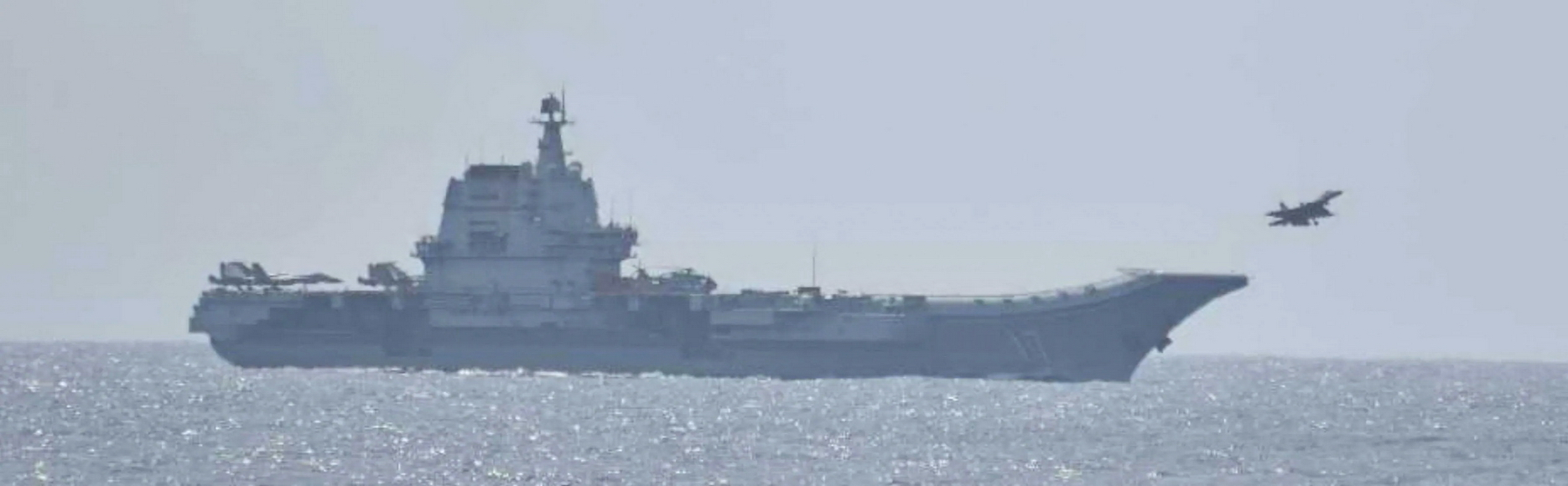
Shenyang J-15 fighter jet flying from Shandong during military exercises around Taiwan

During the April 2023 United Sharp Sword military exercises, Shandong was deployed in the Philippine Sea, where she simulated air and sea strikes on neighbouring Taiwan from waters close to Okinawa, according to a report from Japan's Ministry of Defense. Several PLAN jet fighters and helicopters took off and landed on the carrier 120 times in 48 hours. Shandong, three other warships, and a support vessel came to within 230 kilometres of Japan's Miyako Islands at one stage. Taiwan's defence ministry also released a map that showed four Shenyang J-15 fighters flying to the island's east, with the Chinese military later confirming fighters from Shandong, loaded with live ammunition, had "carried out multiple waves of simulated strikes on important targets". Shandong and other vessels accompanying her (one Type 055 destroyer, two Type 052D destroyers, two Type 054A frigates, and a single Type 901 replenishment ship) thereafter sailed east into the Pacific Ocean, at one point coming within 600 kilometers of Guam, before finally turning westwards and entering the South China Sea via the Bashi Channel at the end of April. The Shandong later returned to the Philippine Sea for a five-day deployment in September 2023, while also staging a 12 day deployment in the same area in late October 2023. In early November 2023, the Shandong was detected sailing north through the Taiwan Strait, possibly towards Dalian shipyard for maintenance, by Taiwan's Ministry of National Defense.

==== 2024 ====
The Shandong entered the Philippine Sea for a nine-day deployment in July 2024 and conducted a series of operations approximately 300 miles east of the Luzon Strait. A large escort fleet (cruisers CNS Yan'an and CNS Xianyang, destroyers CNS Guilin and CNS Zhanjiang, frigate CNS Yuncheng and support ship CNS Chaganhu) was also detected in the area. Japanese authorities monitoring the Shandong carrier strike group observed 240 fighter aircraft launches / recoveries (most likely Shenyang J-15 jets) and 140 helicopter take-offs & landings, with Japan Air Self-Defense Force scrambling its own jet aircraft in response. The Shandong finally sailed to Yulin Naval Base in Hainan at the conclusion of the exercises. The Shandong then returned to the same area in August 2024 for further exercises. Japan Maritime Self Defense Force vessels observed the cruiser CNS Yan'an, destroyer CNS Zhanjiang and frigate CNS Yuncheng escorting the Shandong during its August deployment.

In late October 2024, the Shandong conducted dual aircraft carrier formation exercises with the Liaoning for the first time in the South China Sea, alongside a dozen escort vessels, including destroyers, frigates, and replenishment ships. Special dual-carrier tactics were rehearsed over several days by the Chinese naval task force, such as one carrier practicing surface attacks while the other simulated the seizure of air superiority and conducting air defense operations.

==== 2025 ====
On 1 April 2025, as part of the combined PLA Navy and China Coast Guard "Strait Thunder 2025A" war games surrounding Taiwan, the Shandong entered Taiwan's self-declared "military response zone" and at one point maneuvered 24 nautical miles off Taiwan's coast, which was the closest it had ever sailed along the Taiwanese mainland. Taiwan's Defence Ministry released a statement that they had dispatched their own warships and aircraft to intercept the Shandong aircraft carrier group, adding that they had not yet detected any live fire by the Chinese military vessels. The PLA Eastern Theatre Command later announced that the Shandong task group would conduct naval exercises in waters to the east of Taiwan, such as simulated air strikes on maritime targets and the seizure of area air superiority.

Chinese state broadcaster CCTV reported in May 2025 that the Shandong had "expelled" aircraft carriers from a foreign country that had been "showing off power" in the South China Sea. The report did not say from which country these ships were or on what date the incidents happened.

In early June 2025, the Shandong along with the Liaoning both conducted navigation exercises past the Second Island Chain for the first time. The Shandong naval group, which also consisted of Type 055 destroyer Zunyi and Type 052D guided-missile destroyer Zhanjiang, as well as Type 054A guided-missile frigates Yuncheng and Hengshui along with fast combat support ship Chaganhu, was detected by the Japanese defence ministry conducting take-off and landing drills involving jet fighters and helicopters around the Bonin Islands approximately 100 kilometers to the north of Okinotorishima atoll. The Liaoning naval group, which was escorted by Type 055 guided-missile destroyer Wuxi and Type 052D guided-missile destroyer Tangshan, Type 055 destroyer Nanchang, Type 052D destroyer Qiqihar, Type 054A guided-missile frigate Yantai, and replenishment ship Kekexilihu, as well as fast combat support ship Hulunhu, was also detected performing aircraft training drills around 300 kilometers southwest of Minamitorishima island. Defence Minister of Taiwan Wellington Koo commented on 11 June that the crossing of the Second Island Chain was "a definite political message" from the People's Liberation Army Navy. Chief Cabinet Secretary of Japan Yoshimasa Hayashi later revealed that a Shenyang J-15 from the Shandong had intercepted a P-3C patrol aircraft of the Japan Maritime Self-Defense Force over international waters around 550 kilometers south east of Miyako Island during the same drills. As of 17 June, aircraft carried out an estimated 230 takeoffs and landings on Shandong during the training exercise, according to observers from the JMSDF. On 30 June 2025, the PLA announced that both carriers had returned to their home ports after they had completed "combat training on the high seas".

On 3 July, Shandong and two destroyers and one frigate from its strike group—destroyers Yanan and Zhanjiang, and the frigate Yuncheng—arrived in Hong Kong on a visit to increase patriotism, shortly after the 28th anniversary of the handover of Hong Kong. The vessels were open for public tours in Hong Kong for a number of days, with all 10,000 tickets to visit them sold out. The aircraft carrier was also inspected by John Lee Ka-chiu, the chief executive of Hong Kong. After the visit concluded the Shandong carrier strike group departed for its home port on 7 July.

== Design ==
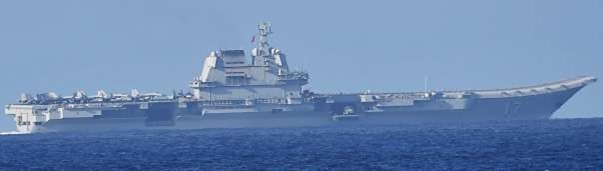
Starboard side of Shandong, in 2023

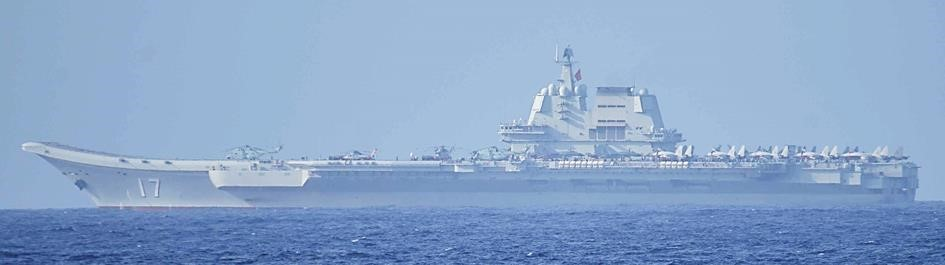
Port side of Shandong, in 2023

The aircraft carrier's external design is largely based on China's first carrier Liaoning, which was itself built from the partially-complete hull of the Soviet Kuznetsov-class aircraft carrier Varyag. It retains the ski-jump takeoff, which limits its air wing to helicopters and Shenyang J-15 fighter jets of the People's Liberation Army Navy Air Force, and the ship is powered by conventional oil-fired boilers driving eight steam turbines derived from the Soviet-designed examples installed on Liaoning. It measures about 305 metres (1,001 ft) long, with a displacement of about 55,000 metric tons (54,000 long tons) (66,000–70,000 t, 65,000–69,000 long tons loaded).

While sharing a superficial resemblance to Liaoning, the design details of Shandong are drastically changed and display a higher priority on aircraft operations. The silo space reserved for anti-ship missiles located below the forward flight deck, which was part of the original Kuznetsov design, was removed from the design of Shandong completely, freeing up spaces for additional hangar area. The ski jump angle was optimized from 14.0° to 12.0°, which is the ideal take-off angle for launching the Shenyang J-15 fighter. The island structure is smaller by 10%, and sponsons are extended in the aft-starboard section, allowing more space for up to eight more aircraft and helicopters. A second glaze deck was added to the island, improving flight operation efficiency.

Shandong, like its predecessor, uses the simpler "short take-off barrier-arrested recovery" (STOBAR) launch and recovery system.

== See also ==
- List of aircraft carriers in service
- Chinese aircraft carrier programme

Equivalent aircraft carriers of the same era

- Vikrant class
- Vikramaditya class
- Russian aircraft carrier Admiral Kuznetsov
