= RBU-12000 =

Soviet anti-submarine rocket launcher

The RBU-12000 Udav-1 is a Soviet ship-borne anti-submarine weapon system. The weapon fires a number of different types of rockets, which in addition to attacking submarines provide a multi-layer defense against torpedoes and frogmen. The system operates in conjunction with the ship's sonar.

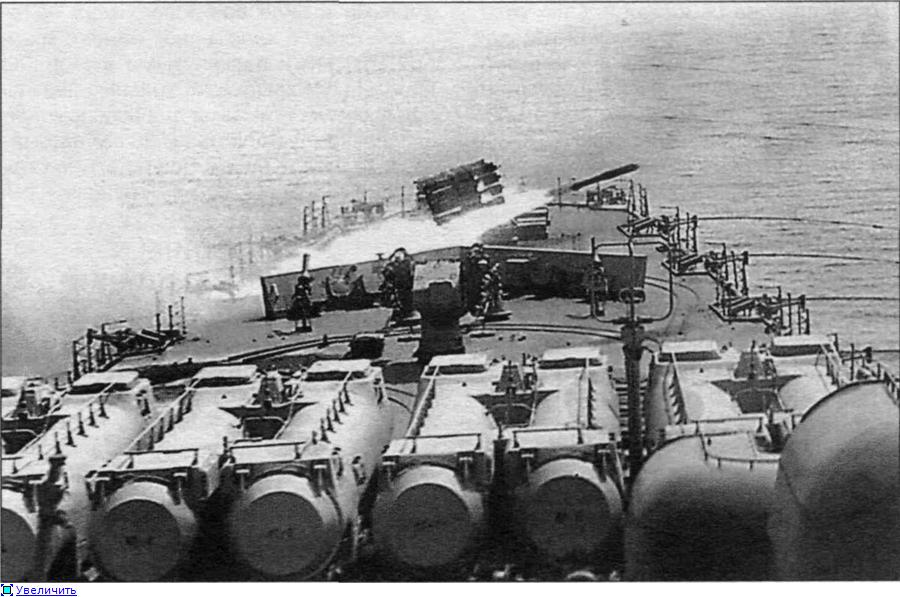
UDAV-1 firing on board the Soviet Aircraft Carrier Baku

The system consists of:

- A KT-153 remotely controlled multi-barrel automated rocket launcher with indirect elevation/traverse stabilization;
- 111SG depth-charge rockets with HE warhead and impact-time fuse to engage underwater targets;
- 111SZ mine-laying rockets with hydro-acoustic proximity fuze for remote mining of a water area to make a barrier for incoming torpedoes;
- 111SO decoy rockets to divert homing torpedoes from the surface ship by creating false acoustic target;
- fire control devices;
- an ammunition loading device;
- ground support equipment.

== Specifications ==
Number of barrels: 10
Number of rockets (including reloads): 40-60
Effective range: 3,000 meters
Effective dept: 600 meters
Firing modes: single, salvo
Rocket caliber: 300 mm
Rocket length: 2,200 mm
Reaction time: 15 seconds
Intercept probability (salvo): 0.9 vs. torpedoes, 0.76 vs. homing torpedoes

== Ship deployment ==
- Kiev-class aircraft carrier
- Kuznetsov-class aircraft carrier
- Kirov-class battlecruiser
- Udaloy-class destroyer
