= Kuznetsov-class aircraft carrier =

Russian and Chinese ship class

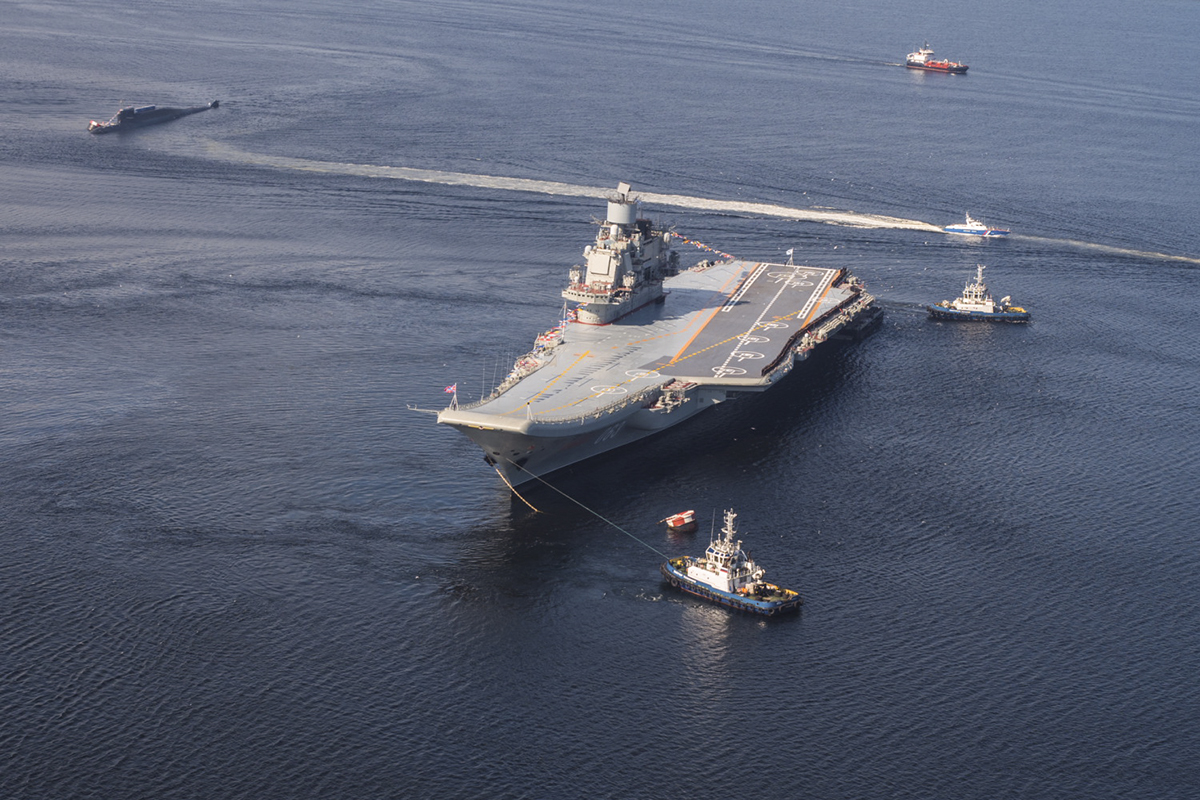
- Admiral Kuznetsov in 2017

Class overview
- Name: Kuznetsov class
- Builders: Chernomorskiy Shipyard 444; Dalian Shipbuilding Industry
- Operators: People's Liberation Army Navy; Soviet Navy (former operator); Russian Navy (former operator)
- Preceded by: Kiev class
- Succeeded by: Ulyanovsk-class (USSR — cancelled); Project 23000 (Russia — planned); Type 003 (China)
- Subclasses: Type 001; Type 002
- Built: 1982–2019
- In commission: 25 December 1990–present
- Completed: 3
- Active: 2
- Laid up: 1

General characteristics
- Type: Heavy aircraft cruiser/Aircraft carrier
- Displacement: 43,000 t (42,000 long tons), light; 55,000 t (54,000 long tons), standard; 58,600 t (57,700 long tons), max
- Length: 305 m (1,000 ft 8 in)
- Beam: 72 m (236 ft 3 in)
- Draught: 11 m (36 ft 1 in)
- Propulsion: Steam turbines 80,000 shp (60,000 kW); 200,000 shp (150,000 kW)
- Speed: 29 knots (54 km/h; 33 mph)
- Range: 8,500 nmi (15,700 km; 9,800 mi) at 18 kn (33 km/h; 21 mph); 3,800 nmi (7,000 km; 4,400 mi) at 29 kn (54 km/h; 33 mph)
- Complement: 1,500
- Armament: (Kuznetsov); 12 × P-700 Granit (SS-N-19 Shipwreck) AShMs; 192 × 3K95 Kinzhal (SA-N-9 Gauntlet) SAMs; 8 × Kashtan CIWS; 6 × AK-630 CIWS; 60 × UDAV-1 ASW rockets; (Liaoning and Shandong); 3 × Type 1130 CIWS; 3 × HQ-10 SAMs
- Aircraft carried: 30–50; 18–32 × fixed-wing aircraft; 18–24 × helicopters
- Aviation facilities: 14,700 m^{2} (158,000 sq ft) flight deck; two aircraft lift; bow ski-jump

The Kuznetsov-class aircraft carrier (Note: Russian: Авиано́сцы ти́па «Кузнецо́в», romanised: Avianostsii Tipa Kuznetsov), Soviet designation Project 1143.5, is a class of conventionally-powered aircraft carriers currently operated by the Chinese People's Liberation Army Navy (PLAN), and also by the Russian Navy until recently. Originally designed for the Soviet Navy, the Kuznetsov-class uses a Short Take-Off but Arrested Recovery (STOBAR) system combining a ski-jump and arresting gears for the launch and recovery of high-performance jet aircraft, representing a major advance in Soviet/Russian naval aviation over the previous Kiev-class, which did not have full-length flight deck and could only launch VSTOL aircraft. The official classification for the ship class by the Soviet Union and Russian Federation is "heavy aircraft-carrying cruiser" (Note: Russian: тяжёлый авианесущий крейсер, romanised: Tjazhjolyj Avianesushhij Krejser), which permits the ships to transit the Turkish Straits without violating the Montreux Convention.

Due to the dissolution of the Soviet Union in late 1991, the three Kuznetsov-class ships were built over a protracted period of almost four decades. Two ships were originally laid down at the Nikolayev South Shipyard in the Ukrainian SSR, to be followed by the Ulyanovsk-class nuclear-powered supercarriers. Only the lead ship Admiral Kuznetsov had been commissioned when the Soviet Union dissolved, and the ship then served in the Russian Navy until being laid up in 2017, with reports suspecting it will eventually be decommissioned and replaced by the newly planned Shtorm-class carriers. Construction of her sister ship Varyag, which was only two-thirds-complete at the time, was abandoned until 1998, when a now-independent Ukraine sold the uncompleted ship to a Chinese company registered in Macau for alleged use as a floating casino, along with a complete set of design blueprints. After a protracted towed journey through three different oceans, Varyag arrived at the Dalian Shipyard where it was eventually modified and completed, redesignated as Type 001 and commissioned in 2012 as Liaoning, the first active ship of the Chinese aircraft carrier programme. China subsequently constructed a third ship Shandong to a modified Type 002 design, commissioning for active service in 2019.

== Role ==
The Kuznetsov-class ships were described by their Soviet builders as Tyazholiy Avianesushchiy Kreyser (TAKR or TAVKR) – "heavy aircraft-carrying cruiser" – intended to support and defend strategic missile-carrying submarines, surface ships, and maritime missile-carrying aircraft of the Soviet fleet. In its fleet defense role, Admiral Kuznetsov's P-700 Granit (SS-N-19 NATO reporting name: Shipwreck) anti-ship cruise missiles, 3K95 Kinzhal (Gauntlet) surface-to-air missiles, and Su-33 (Flanker-D) aircraft are its main weapons. The fixed-wing aircraft on Kuznetsov are intended for air superiority operations to protect a deployed task force. The carrier also carries numerous helicopters for anti-submarine warfare (ASW) and search and rescue (SAR) operations.

The two sister ships of Admiral Kuznetsov, i.e. Liaoning (which were two-thirds Soviet-built but completed by China) and Shandong (which were fully Chinese-built), are however designated to be typical aircraft carriers fully dedicated to aircraft operations and carrying no offensive weaponry on board, unlike their Russian counterpart.

=== Transiting the Turkish Straits ===
Both the Soviet and Russian naval system classifies the Kuznetsov-class as a "heavy aircraft-carrying cruiser" because it was fitted with long-range anti-ship cruise missiles. Under the 1936 Montreux Convention, aircraft carriers heavier than 15,000 tons may not pass through the Turkish Straits. Since Kuznetsov far exceeds that displacement limit, it would have been confined to the Black Sea (where the ship class was built) if classified as an aircraft carrier. However, since there is no tonnage restriction on other types of capital ships operated by Black Sea powers, a large "cruiser" can pass freely through the Turkish Straits without any nominal violation. Turkey has allowed Admiral Kuznetsov to pass through the Straits, and no other signatory to the Montreux Convention has objected to its designation as an aircraft cruiser.

The Chinese naval classification regards its Kuznetsov-class ships (known as Type 001 and Type 002) as aircraft carriers. Both the Type 001 Liaoning and the Type 002 Shandong are armed with air-defense weapons, but not equipped with the anti-ship or anti-submarine missiles as on Admiral Kuznetsov. Instead, the hangar was extended to carry more aircraft. When Liaoning (then known as Varyag, and only completed as an unengined hull) was sold to a Chinese company in Macau (ostensibly to become a floating casino) and due to be towed through the Turkish Strait in June 2000, the Turkish Government denied its access (effectively as an extortion) for 16 months and only relented after Chinese Government promised trade and tourism concessions via diplomacy, and the ship finally passed through both the Bosphorus and the Dardanelles by 2 November 2001.

== History ==
In October 1978 the Soviet government decided to continue the production of additional Project 1143 (Kiev-class) aircraft carriers, with the fifth vessel built with improved features like catapults and arresting gear. This resulted in the Project 1143.5 (Kuznetsov class) plan created by the Nevskoye Bureau and approved at the end of 1979. As originally planned, Project 1143.5 was to have a full load displacement of 65,000 tons, CATOBAR capability, and an air wing based around fixed-wing aircraft and Kamov helicopters. However, by 1980 Soviet defense minister Dmitry Ustinov ordered the deletion of the catapults, reduction of the ship's displacement by 10,000 tons, and revision of the air component toward VSTOL aircraft. The design was revised to support only VSTOL aircraft under the project name "Nitka", but then was revised again to its final configuration to provide for fixed-wing aircraft by adding a 14-degree Ski-jump.

== Design ==
=== Hull and flight deck ===
The hull design is derived from the 1982 Kiev class, but is larger in both length and beam. The Kiev-class ships had only an angled flight deck, with surface weaponry on the foredeck. The Kuznetsov class is the first Soviet carrier to be designed with a full-length flight deck. The ship's 12 anti-ship cruise missiles are located in launchers below the flight deck, just aft of the ski-jump.

The aircraft carriers are of a STOBAR configuration: Short Take-Off But Arrested Recovery. Short take-off is achieved by using a 14-degree ski-jump on the bow. There is also an angled recovery deck with arresting wires, allowing aircraft to land without interfering with launching aircraft. The flight deck has a total area of 14,700 square metres (158,000 sq ft). Two aircraft elevators, on the starboard side forward and aft of the island, move aircraft between the hangar deck and the flight deck.

=== Air wing ===
In the original project specifications, the ship should be able to carry up to 33 fixed-wing aircraft and 12 helicopters . The primary aircraft carried are Sukhoi Su-33 fighters, naval variants of the Sukhoi Su-27 Flanker. Kamov Ka-27 naval utility helicopters (and subsequent variants) make up the helicopter wing, providing anti-submarine, maritime patrol and naval assault mobility capabilities. In addition, the Kamov Ka-52K "Katran" attack helicopter, a naval variant of the Kamov Ka-50, can also be included in its air wing.

=== Armament ===
The Kuznetsov-class ships were originally designed as aircraft cruisers. Kuznetsov carried twelve launchers for P-700 Granit (SS-N-19 Shipwreck) anti-ship surface-to-surface missiles, which also form the main armament of the Kirov-class battlecruisers. The Granits were stored in 12 vertical launchers located beneath the ship's front deck, just before the inclined ski-jump. The top deck hatches of these launchers open to fire the missiles; however, when open they prevent the simultaneous launch of aircraft. Kuznetsov's heavy surface armament differs from that of other countries' aircraft carriers, which carry only defensive armament and rely on their aircraft for strike power.

For long-range air defense, Kuznetsov carries 24 vertical Tor missile system (SA-N-9 Gauntlet) surface-to-air missile launchers, with 192 missiles. For close-range air defense, the ship carries eight Kashtan (CIWS) mounts. Each mount has two launchers for 9M311 SAMs, twin GSh-30 30 mm rotary cannons, and a radar/optronic director. The ship also carries six AK-630 30 mm rotary cannons in single mounts. For defense against underwater attack, the ship carries the Udav-1 ASW rocket launcher.

The Russian Navy reportedly removed the Granit missile tubes in the late 2000s to make room for a larger hangar bay, but it was never clear that the tubes were ever actually removed. During a major overhaul set to begin in September 2017, the P-700 tubes were to be replaced with new vertical launch tubes capable of housing newer Kalibr and P-800 Oniks cruise missiles. Air defense upgrades would include replacement of the Kashtan CIWS with the Pantsir-M and the 3K95 Kinzhal/Tor system with the Poliment-Redut system.

=== Electronics ===
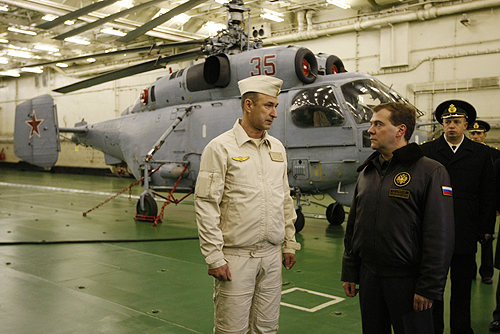
Kamov Ka-27PL ASW helicopter on board Admiral Kuznetsov with Dmitry Medvedev in 2008

Admiral Kuznetsov has D/E band air and surface target acquisition radar (passive electronically scanned array), F band surface search radar, G/H band flight control radar, I band navigation radar, and four K band fire-control radars for the Kashtan CIWS.

The ship has hull-mounted medium- and low-frequency search and attack sonar. The ASW helicopters have surface search radar, dipping sonar, sonobuoys, and magnetic anomaly detectors (MAD).

=== Propulsion and performance ===
Admiral Kuznetsov is conventionally powered by mazut fuelled steam boilers which feed four steam turbines, each producing 50,000 hp (37 MW), driving four shafts with fixed-pitch propellers. The maximum speed is 29 knots (54 km/h; 33 mph), and her range at maximum speed is 3,800 nautical miles (7,000 km; 4,400 mi). At 18 knots (33 km/h; 21 mph), her maximum economical range is 8,500 nautical miles (15,700 km; 9,800 mi).

=== Reliability ===
Admiral Kuznetsov has been plagued by years of technical problems. The vessel's steam turbines and turbo-pressurised boilers have been reported to be so unreliable that the carrier is accompanied by a large ocean-going tug whenever it deploys, in case it breaks down. There are also flaws in the water piping system, which causes it to freeze during winter. To prevent pipes from bursting, the water is turned off in most of the cabins, and half the latrines do not work.

=== Type 001 design changes ===
The Chinese Type 001 ships are configured as aircraft carriers. The cruise missile launchers were never installed, and the launcher base was removed during the refit to incorporate a larger hangar bay. The air-defense system consists of FL-3000N surface-to-air-missiles and the Type 1130 CIWS.

=== Type 002 design changes ===
Several design changes were made to the Type 002 aircraft carrier. Length, width, and displacement have been slightly increased. The island of the ship has been reduced in size to increase the size of the flight deck, and it carries a 3-D phased array radar. The ship is claimed to carry 36 aircraft instead of the 24 J-15 fighters carried by Liaoning.

== Ships ==
Construction data
Name	Class/subclass	Displacement (tonnes)	Operator	Namesake	Builder	Laid down	Launched	Commissioned	Status
Admiral Flota Sovetskogo Soyuza Kuznetsov (ex-Riga, ex-Leonid Brezhnev, ex-Tbilisi)	Kuznetsov	58,600 full	Russian Navy	Nikolay Gerasimovich Kuznetsov	Soviet Shipyard No. 444	1 April 1982	6 December 1985	25 December 1990	Undergoing refit, suspected decommissioning
Liaoning (ex-Riga, ex-Varyag)	Type 001	60,900 full	People's Liberation Army Navy	Liaoning Province	Soviet Shipyard No. 444; Dalian Shipyard (completion)	6 December 1985	4 December 1988; 2011 (formal)	25 September 2012	Active
Shandong	Type 002	64,000 full	People's Liberation Army Navy	Shandong Province	Dalian Shipyard	March 2015	26 April 2017	17 December 2019	Active

=== Admiral Kuznetsov ===
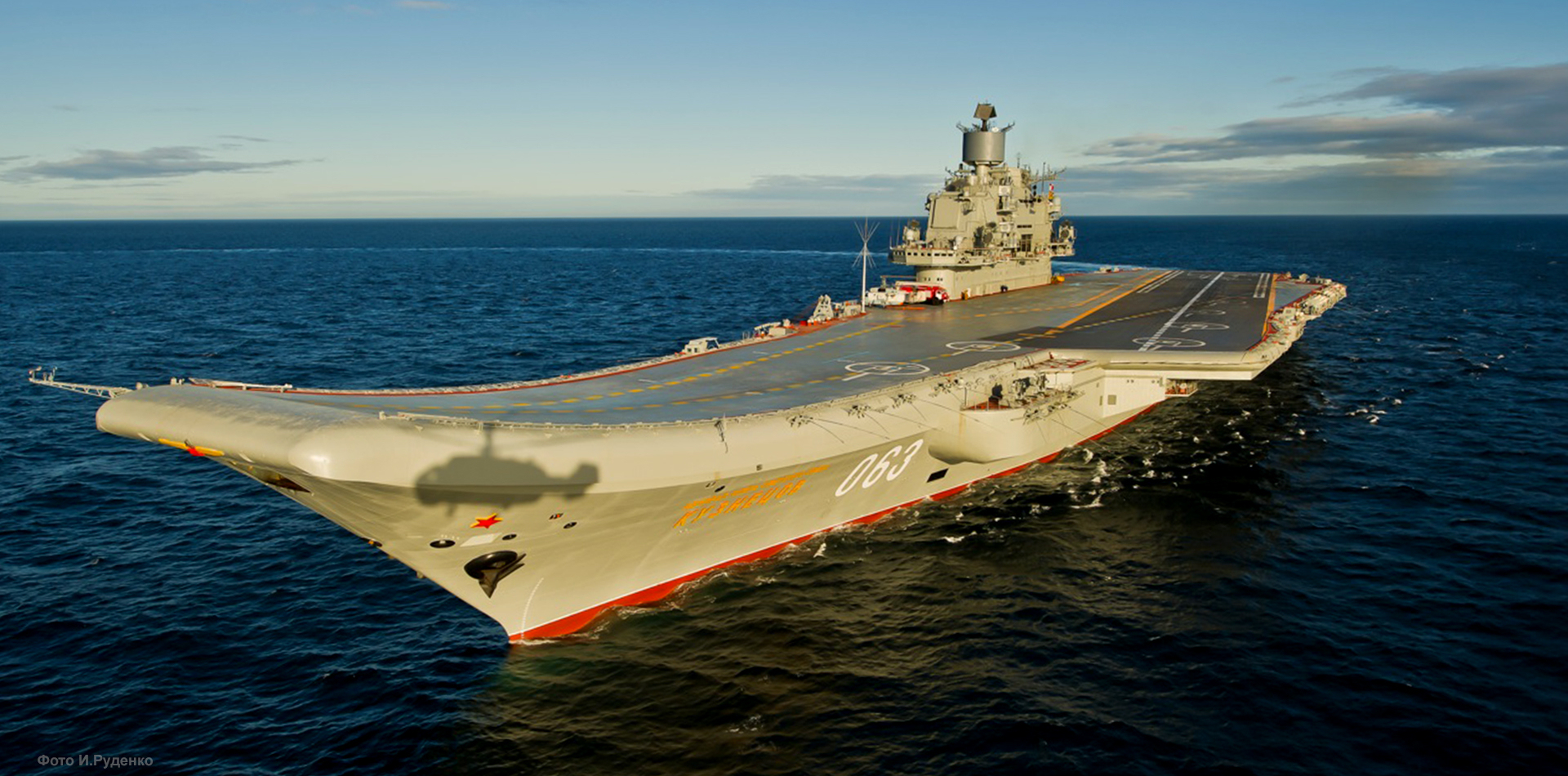
Admiral Kuznetsov underway in 2012. The shadow of a Ka-27 is visible on the bow.

Admiral Flota Sovetskogo Soyuza Kuznetsov was designed by the Neva Design Bureau, St. Petersburg, and built at the Nikolayev South Shipyard (Chernomorskoye Shipyard) in the Ukrainian SSR. She was launched in 1985, commissioned in 1990, and became fully operational in 1995. The vessel was named Riga, Leonid Brezhnev, and Tbilisi, before finally being named after Soviet admiral Nikolay Kuznetsov.

During the winter of 1995–1996, Admiral Kuznetsov deployed to the Mediterranean Sea to mark the 300th anniversary of the Russian Navy. In late 2000, Admiral Kuznetsov went to sea for recovery and salvage operations for the submarine Kursk. In late 2007 and early 2008, Admiral Kuznetsov again deployed to the Mediterranean. Most recently, Admiral Kuznetsov was deployed to the Mediterranean in late 2016 and early 2017 to support Russian operations in Syria.

Admiral Kuznetsov started an overhaul and modernization program in the first quarter of 2017 to extend its service life by 25 years, but several setbacks have hampered this effort. Prior to a December 2022 fire the overhaul of the carrier was projected to last into 2024.

As of October 2024 the non-operational Admiral Kuznetsov is the Russian Navy's only carrier leaving the Russian Navy without an operational aircraft carrier. Reports that the crew of 1500 has been reassigned to the Russian Army for combat duty in Ukraine have fueled speculation that there is no plan to make Admiral Kuznetsov seaworthy again.

=== Liaoning ===
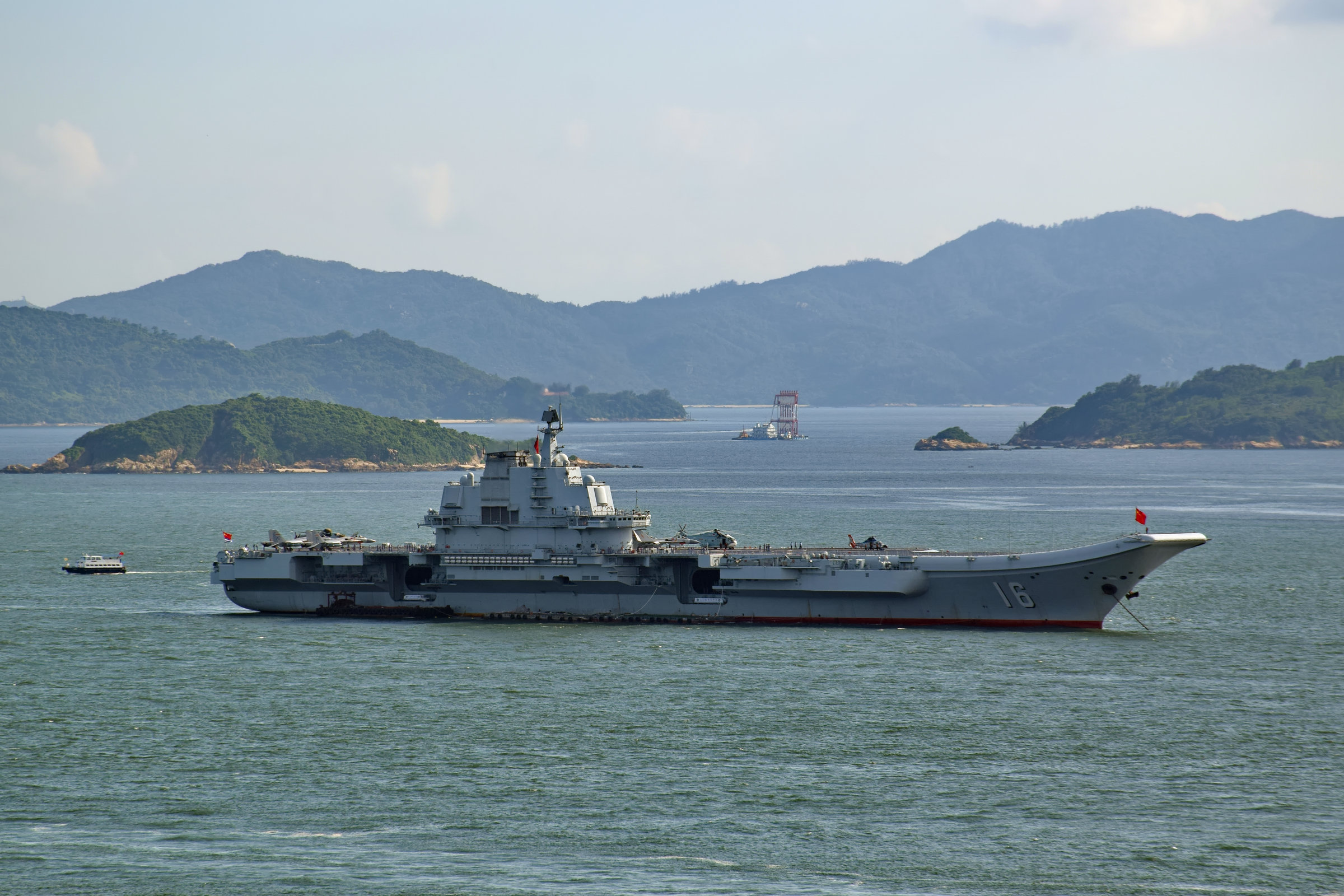
Liaoning in Hong Kong in 2017

The second member of the Kuznetsov class took a much more roundabout route to active service. Known first as Riga and then Varyag, she was laid down by the Nikolayev South Shipyard in 1985 and launched in 1988. Varyag had not yet been commissioned when the Soviet Union dissolved in 1991, and the ship was left to deteriorate in the elements. In 1998, the unfinished hull was sold by Ukraine to what was apparently a Chinese travel agency for ostensible use as a floating hotel and casino. After an eventful journey under tow, she arrived in China in February 2002 and was berthed at the Dalian naval shipyard, where she was overhauled and completed as the first operational ship of the Chinese aircraft carrier programme.

In September 2012, the ship was commissioned in the People's Liberation Army Navy as Liaoning. The ship was named after the province where the shipyard is located, and its Chinese ship class is Type 001. Today, she serves as the first aircraft carrier of the PLAN, and its home port is Qingdao.

=== Shandong ===
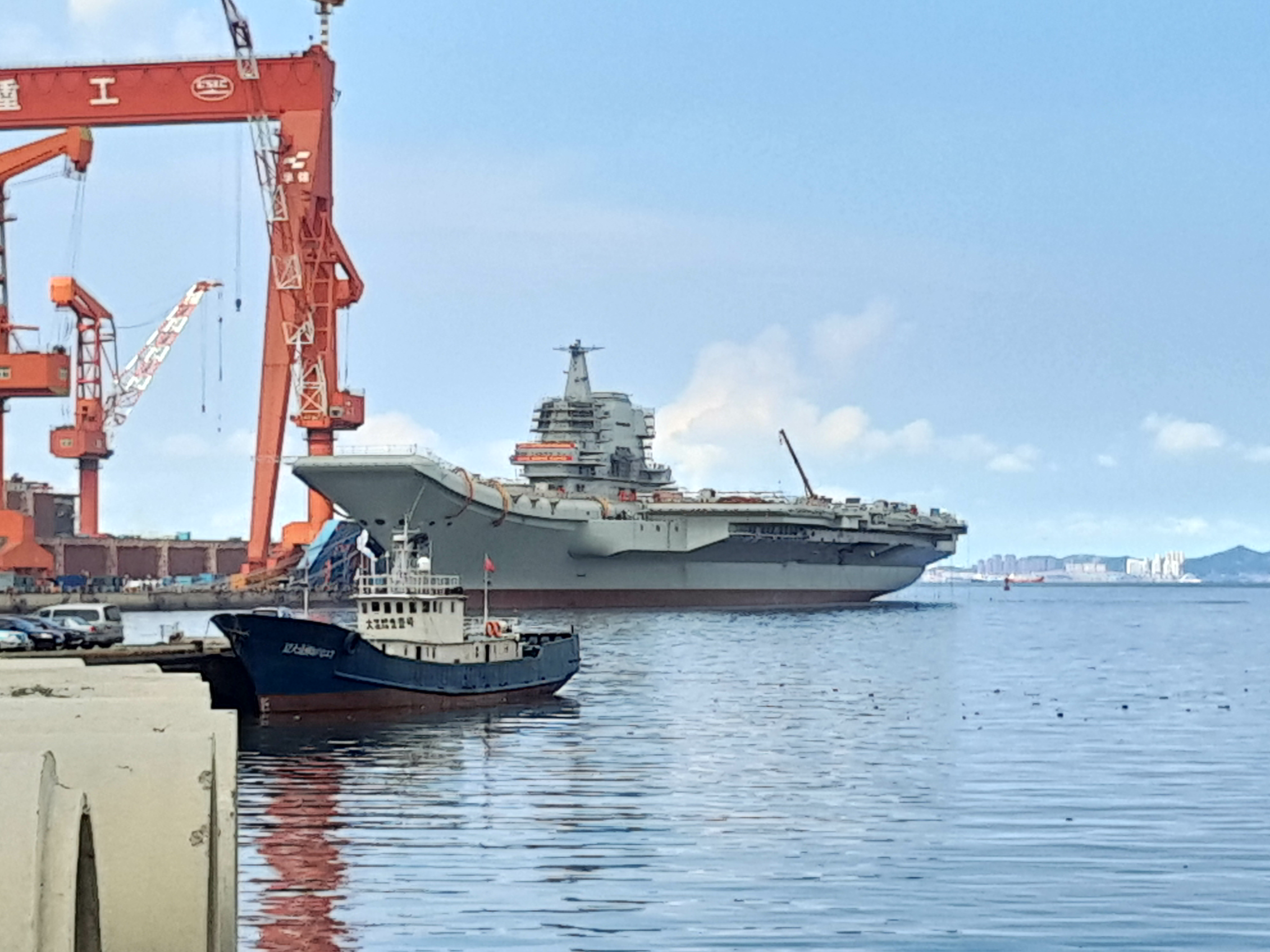
Shandong after launching

The second Chinese aircraft carrier was constructed in China according to a modified design, known as Type 002. The ship was laid down in 2013 at the Dalian naval shipyard and was launched on 26 April 2017. Sea trials began on 13 May 2018, and the ship was commissioned as Shandong on 17 December 2019.

== See also ==
- Shtorm-class supercarrier
- List of aircraft carriers
- List of aircraft carriers of Russia and the Soviet Union
- List of ships of the Soviet Navy
- List of ships of Russia by project number
- List of naval ship classes in service
- Chinese aircraft carrier programme
- Chinese aircraft carrier Fujian
