= STOBAR =

Aircraft carrier launch and recovery system

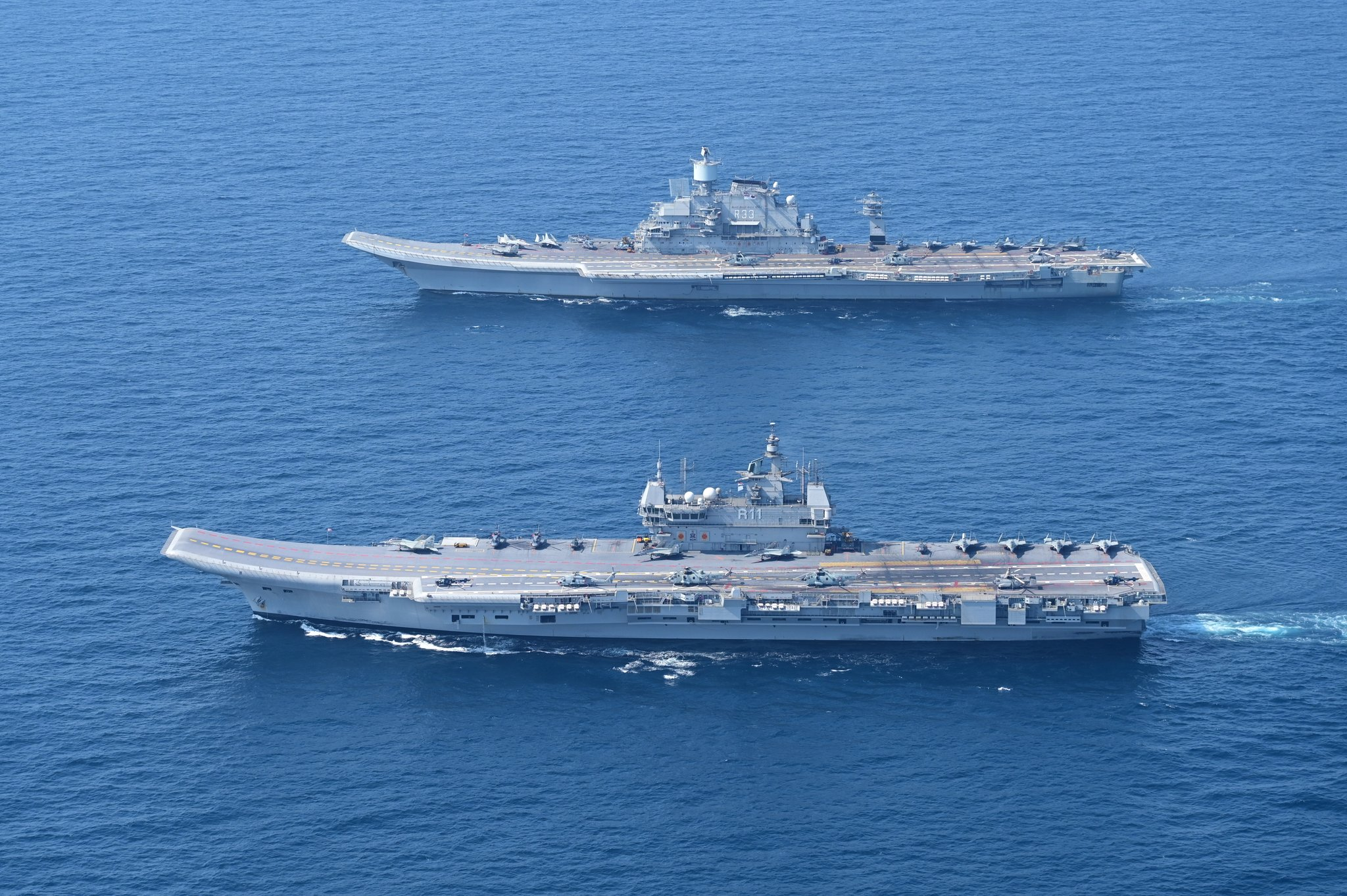
INS Vikrant and INS Vikramaditya with a ski-jump takeoff-ramp for STOBAR

STOBAR (acronym for short take-off but arrested recovery or short take-off, barrier-arrested recovery) is a naval aviation system used for the takeoff and landing of fixed-wing aircraft from the flight deck of an aircraft carrier, where aircraft take off under their own engine power like a conventionally launched aircraft, often via a bow ski-jump to assist takeoff, but use arresting gears at the aft-deck to decelerate the aircraft upon landing. The STOBAR system can launch and recover ordinary fixed-wing navalised aircraft unlike the more specialized short take-off and vertical landing (STOVL) systems, and is simpler and less expensive to build than the more sophisticated catapult-assisted takeoff but arrested recovery (CATOBAR) systems, which use catapults to help accelerate aircraft, but cannot launch heavier aircraft like the latter. As of 2018, STOBAR aircraft carriers have been used widely on Russian, Chinese and Indian Navy aircraft carriers.

== Advantages ==
Compared to CATOBAR, STOBAR is less expensive to develop. It is easier to operate than a CATOBAR configuration, which requires large number of operators to launch the aircraft. The lack of any moving parts in a ski-jump makes it less expensive to maintain than a catapult. It does not require any additional system to generate force required to launch the aircraft, unlike CATOBAR where an external force is needed to be generated either from steam catapult or Electromagnetic Aircraft Launch System (EMALS) to launch the aircraft.

== Limitations ==
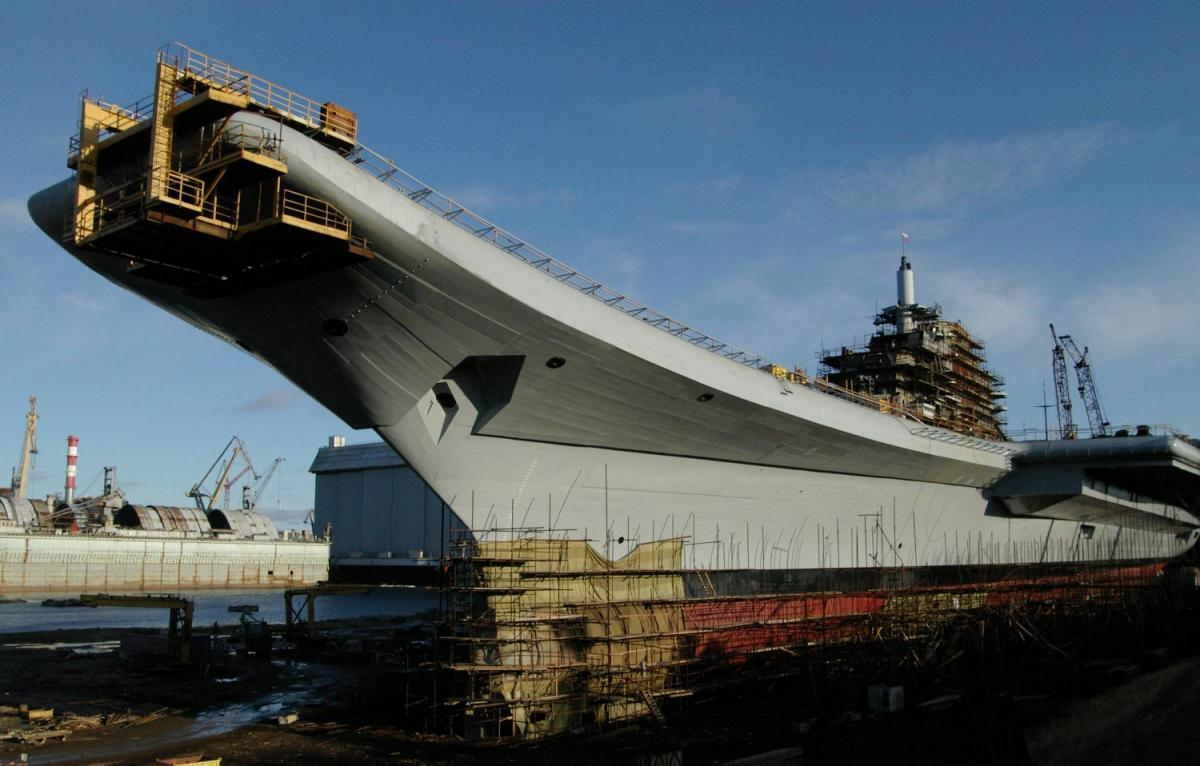
Construction of the ski-jump on INS Vikramaditya

One major limitation of STOBAR configuration is that it only works with fighter aircraft that have a high thrust-to-weight ratio such as Su-33 or MiG-29K and thus limits the kind of aircraft that can be operated from the carrier. It is not known what restrictions ski-jump takeoff implies on maximal aircraft weight. According to some sources, in order to become airborne, the aircraft may be required to limit its weaponry and fuel package in order to reduce the launch weight of the aircraft. However, according to other sources, the Super Hornet can take-off from a ski-jump with a significant weapons load. Using ski-jump can limit the ability to conduct sorties faster on STOBAR aircraft carrier. STOBAR carriers must maintain a speed of 20–30 kn (37–56 km/h) in order to generate wind speed required on deck which is essential for conducting aircraft launch operations.

== List of STOBAR aircraft ==
HAL Tejas (NP-1) short take-off during test flight.

- HAL Tejas – two naval variants are being developed for the Indian Navy; a prototype (NP-1) is currently undergoing flight testing.
- Mikoyan MiG-29K – currently active with the Indian Navy and the Russian Navy.
- Shenyang J-15 – partially based on the Su-33, operated by the People's Liberation Army Navy on Liaoning.
- Sukhoi Su-33 – developed from Su-27 and only operated by the Russian Navy.

== Users ==
As of October 2026, three countries currently operate STOBAR-type carriers; Russia, India and China have built a STOBAR ship for operation, while both India and China have procured STOBAR ships that were built by Russia and have had them converted for their own use.

=== Active STOBAR aircraft carriers ===
Class	Image	Origin	No. of ships	Propulsion	Displacement	Operator	Aircraft carried	Notes
Kuznetsov		Soviet Union	1	Steam turbine	58,000 tons	Russian Navy	Su-33; MiG-29K; Ka-27	Currently laid up and unlikely to return to service, most likely abandoned and to be scrapped.
Kuznetsov		Soviet Union	1	Steam turbine	58,000 tons	People's Liberation Army Navy	J-15; Z-18	
Kiev (INS Vikramaditya)		Soviet Union	1	Steam turbine	45,500 tons	Indian Navy	MiG-29K; Ka-31; Sea King	Built as STOVL carrier and converted to STOBAR
Shandong		China	1	Steam turbine	70,000 tons	People's Liberation Army Navy	J-15; Z-18; Z-9	Upgraded Kuznetsov type design, first aircraft carrier built in China
Vikrant		India	1	Gas turbine	45,000 tonnes	Indian Navy		First aircraft carrier built in India
