= Ski-jump (aviation) =

Take-off ramp for aircraft

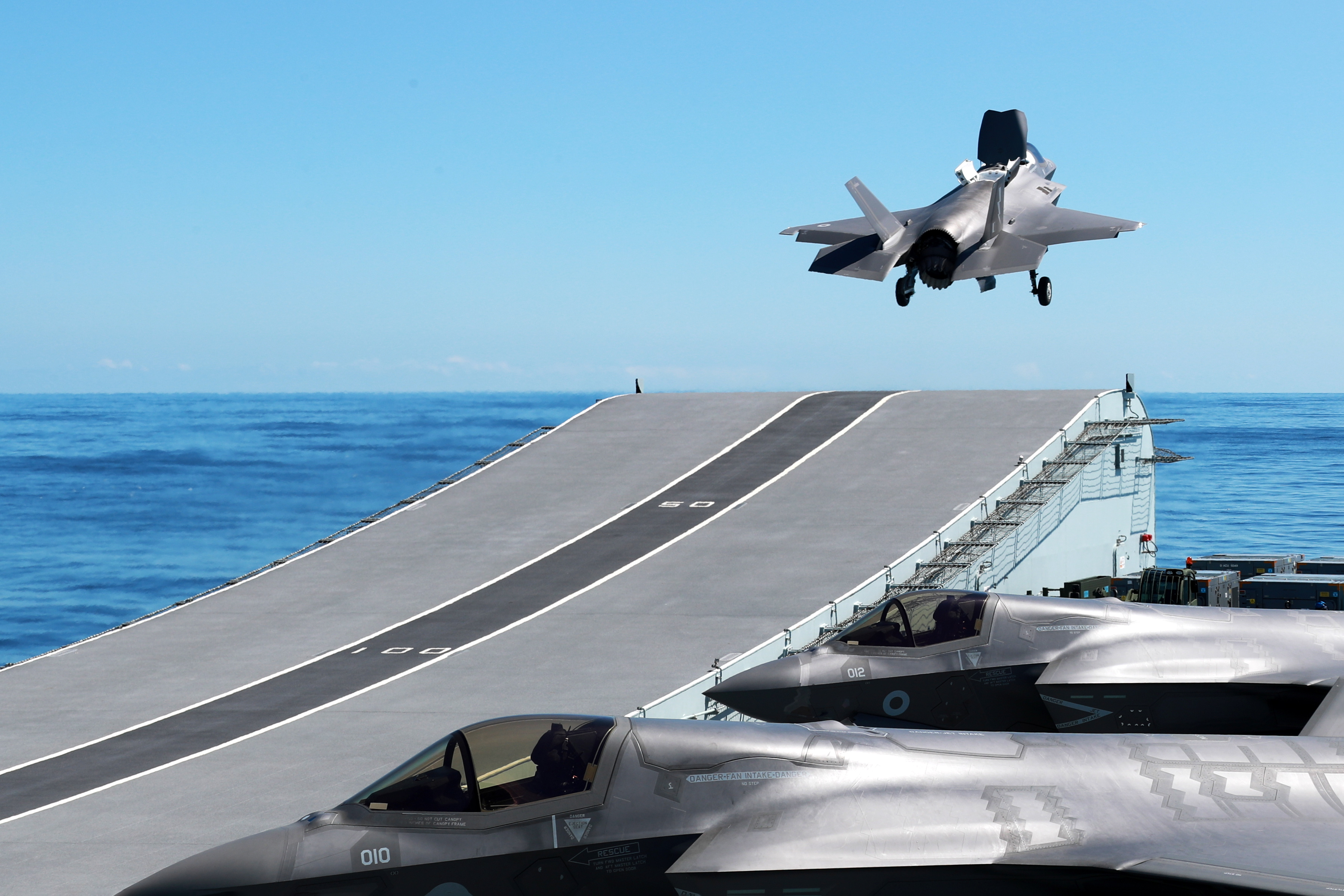
A Lockheed Martin F-35B Lightning II taking off from the aircraft carrier HMS Queen Elizabeth

In aviation, a ski-jump is an upwardly curved ramp that allows a fixed-wing aircraft to take off from a runway that is shorter than what conventional takeoff requires. By providing an upward vector from the ski-jump's normal force, the aircraft leaves the runway at an elevated angle similar to how a ski jumper takes off. This elevated launch angle provides the aircraft a longer airborne time despite a lower speed, where it can continue accelerating under its own engines until reaching enough airspeed to obtain the aerodynamic lift needed to overcome gravity and sustain flight. In modern naval aviation, ski-jumps are commonly used to launch shipborne jet aircraft from flight decks of aircraft carriers that lack aircraft catapults for assisted takeoffs, where the runway lengths are too short for conventional takeoffs for these aircraft (which are much heavier than the older propeller aircraft) and therefore likely resulting in them crashing into the water after launching off the ship.

It is believed that the first use of the ski-jump occurred during the Second World War, when a temporary ramp was added to HMS Furious to help heavily laden Fairey Barracudas attack the German battleship Tirpitz. During the Cold War, the concept was studied as a means of reducing the length of flight decks required for aircraft carriers and to facilitate ever-heavier aircraft at sea. The Royal Navy took a particular interest in the ski-jump during the 1970s, conducting tests with the new Hawker Siddeley Harrier V/STOL fighter, then added a ramp to its next generation of aircraft carrier, the Invincible class.

Numerous naval services have since adopted the ski-jump for their own aircraft carriers and amphibious assault platforms, while land-based uses have been examined as well. Ski-jumps can be used in two ways: Short Take-Off But Arrested Recovery (STOBAR) for tailhook-equipped naval aircraft capable of arresting gear deceleration; and Short Take-Off, Vertical Landing (STOVL) for V/STOL aircraft capable of vertical thrust vectoring. As aircraft catapults are much more sophisticated, costly and energy-intensive systems, currently only three countries (the United States, France and China) are capable of operating Catapult-Assisted Take-Off but Arrested Recovery (CATOBAR) carriers, while all other countries that still have aircraft carriers in the 21st century use STOBAR or STOVL carriers with ski-jumps.

== Principle ==
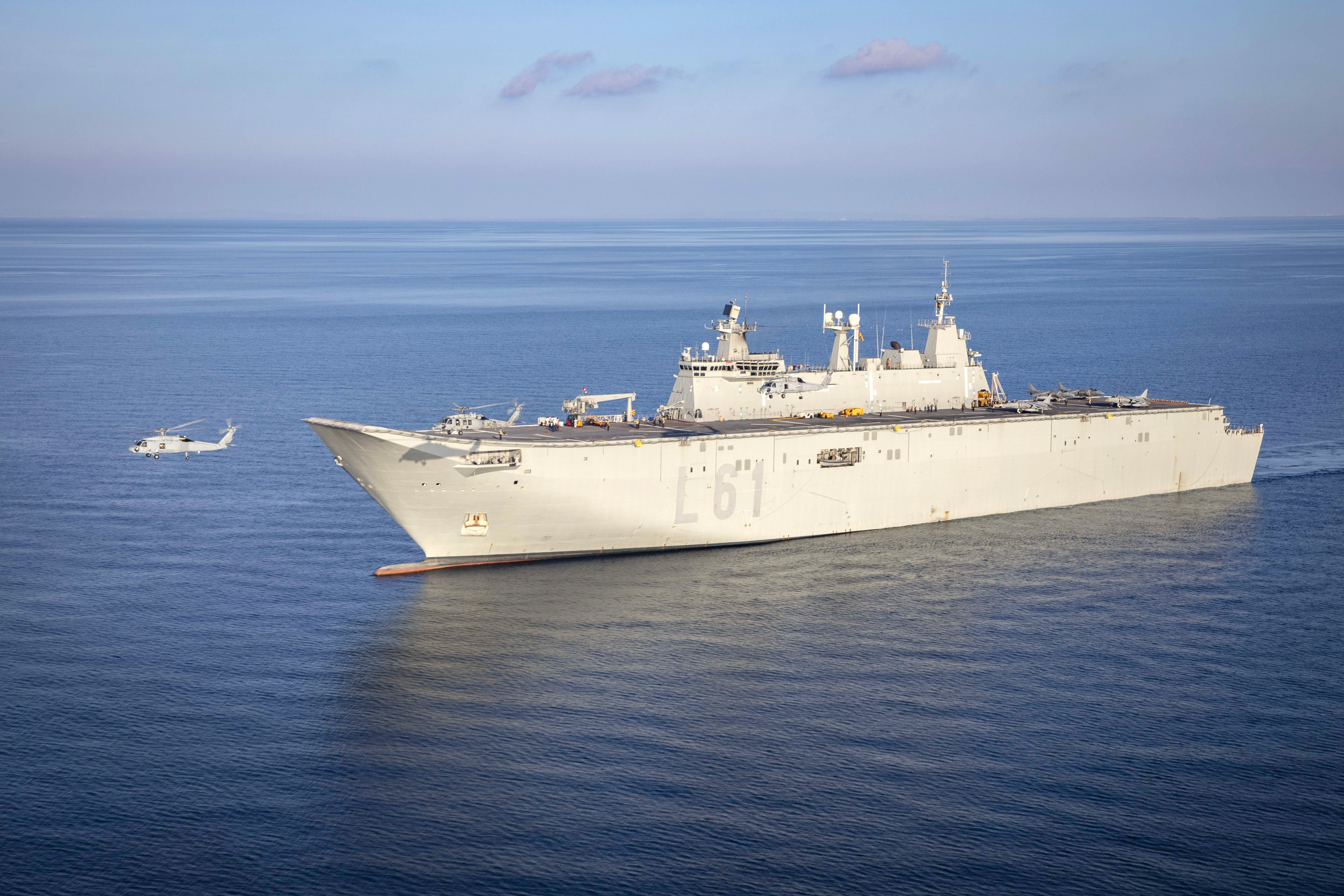
The Spanish Juan Carlos I with ski-jump deck in 2023.

A fixed-wing aircraft must build up forward speed during a lengthy takeoff roll. As the forward velocity increases, the wings produce greater amounts of lift. At a high enough speed, the lift force will exceed the weight of the aircraft, and the aircraft will become capable of sustained flight. Since the aircraft must reach flight speed using only its own engines for power, a long runway is required so that the aircraft can build up speed. On an aircraft carrier, the flight deck is so short that most aircraft cannot reach flight speed before reaching the end of the deck. Since lift is less than gravity, the aircraft will lose altitude after the wheels leave the flight deck and possibly fall into the sea.

A ski-jump ramp at the end of the flight deck redirects the aircraft to a slight upward angle, converting part of the aircraft's forward motion into a positive rate of climb. Since the aircraft is still traveling at an inadequate speed to generate enough lift, its climb rate will start to drop as soon as it leaves the flight deck. However, the ski-jump launch has given the aircraft additional time to continue accelerating. By the time its upward velocity has decayed to zero, the aircraft will be going fast enough for its wings to produce enough lift. At this point, the aircraft will be in stable flight, having launched from the carrier without ever dipping below the height of the flight deck.

Many modern aircraft carriers lack catapults, so heavy aircraft must take off using their own engines. Ski-jumps make it possible for heavier aircraft to take off than a horizontal deck allows. However, ski-jump launches cannot match the payloads made possible by high-speed catapult launches. While aircraft such as the F/A 18 that are normally catapult-launched can make use of a ski-ramp, this typically comes at the cost of a reduced capacity for either fuel or munitions, and thus negatively impacting mission scope significantly.

== History ==
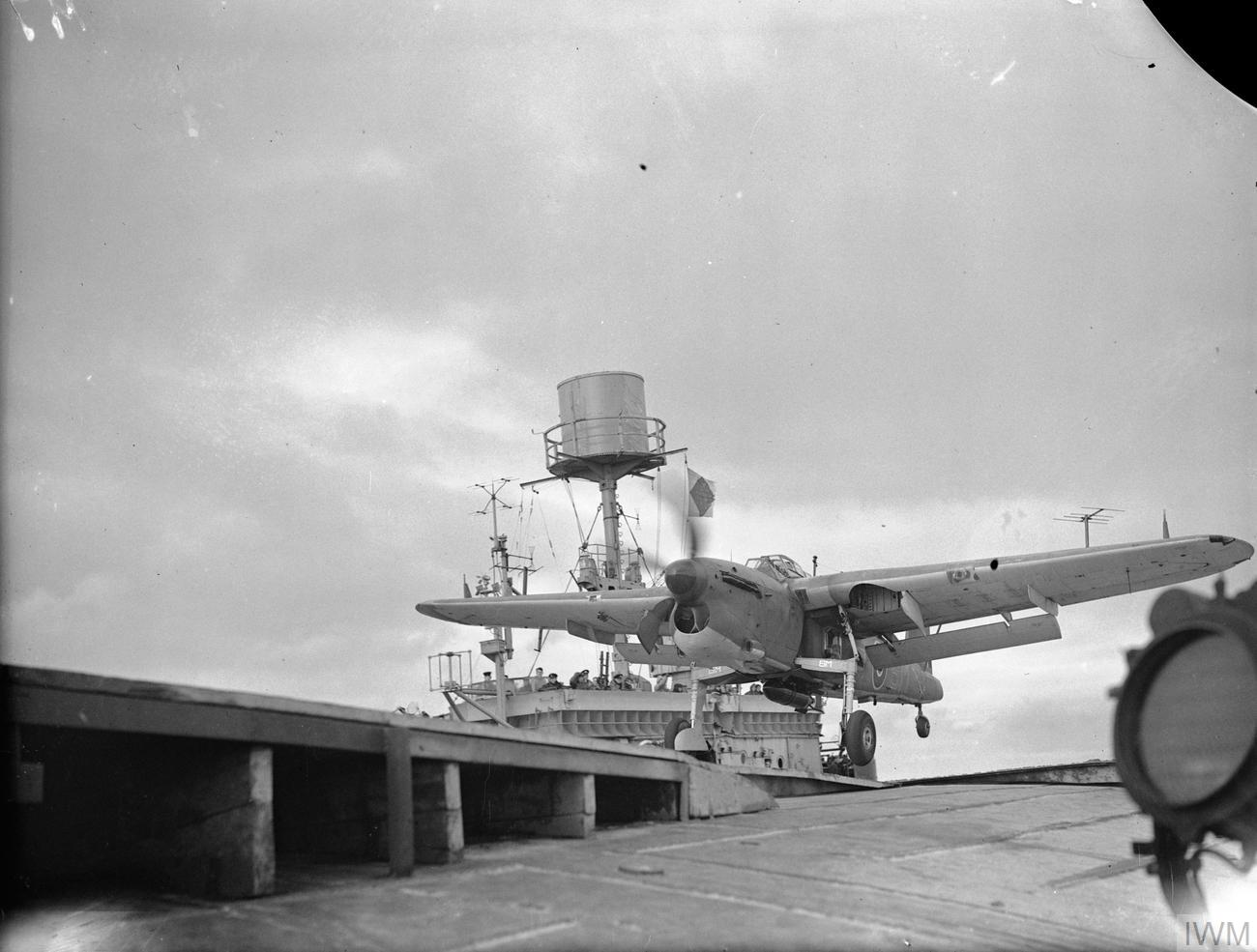
A Fairey Barracuda takes off from the temporary ski-jump on HMS Furious in 1944. The wooden support structure of the ski jump is clearly visible.

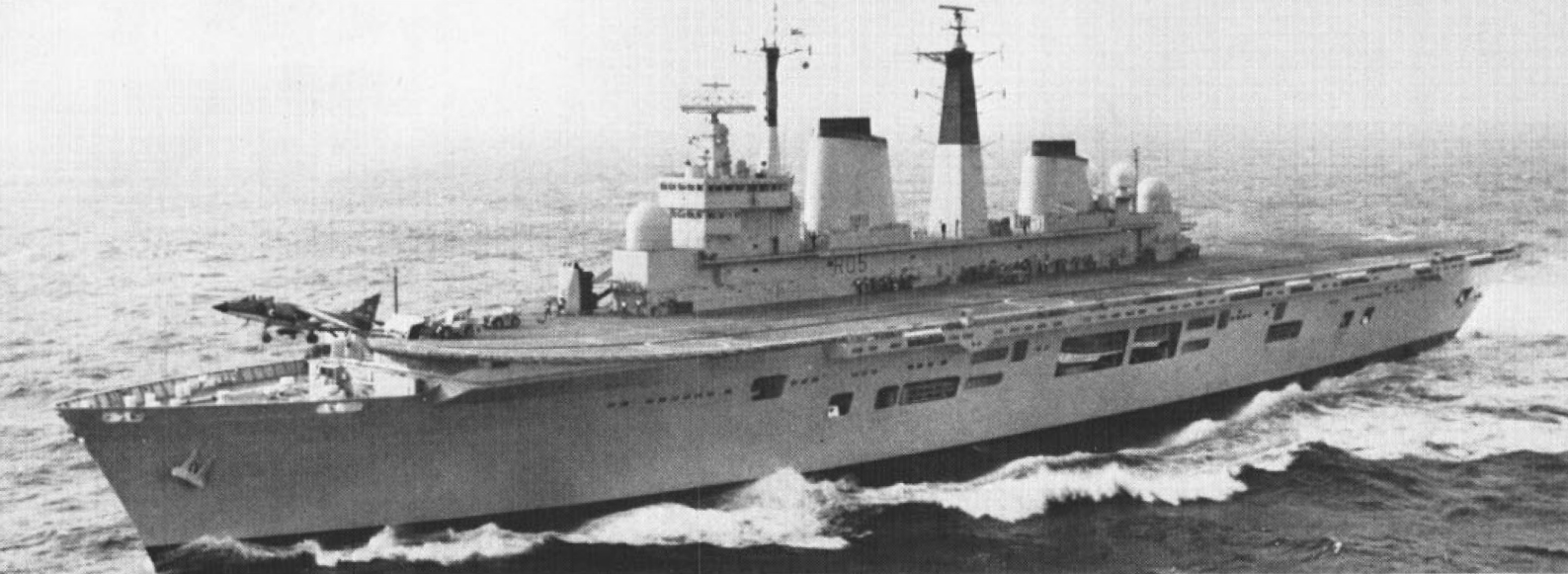
A Sea Harrier launches from HMS Invincible in 1981. Invincible was the first major ship to be fitted with a ski-jump for operational purposes.

Early aircraft carriers could launch aircraft simply by turning into the wind and adding the ship's own speed to the airspeed experienced by the aircraft. During World War II, carrier aircraft became so heavy that assisted take-off became desirable. Deck catapults were used to accelerate aircraft to takeoff speed, especially when launching heavy aircraft or when it was inconvenient to change course. An early use of the ski-jump occurred in 1944, when the British aircraft carrier HMS Furious launched a strike against the German battleship Tirpitz. A relatively crude ski-jump ramp was temporarily installed on the end of the flight deck, which helped the heavily bomb-laden Fairey Barracudas take off.

In the years following the Second World War, the prevailing trend of increasingly heavy carrier aircraft continued apace, leading to fears that eventually such increases would exceed the viable payload capabilities of any catapult system. Accordingly, research into alternative methods of assisting takeoff was conducted. A NACA study completed in 1952 proposed the use of a ski-jump following after the aircraft catapult to provide additional assistance to departing aircraft.

In his 1973 M.Phil. thesis, Lt. Cdr. D.R. Taylor of Britain's Royal Navy proposed the use of a ski-jump to help the Harrier jump jet take off. His ski-jump design, which featured a curve, was initially met with scepticism, but other officials endorsed trials of the proposal. Thus, initial testing using various ramp angles was carried out at RAE Bedford; the aircraft used was the two-seat Harrier demonstrator G-VTOL. The results were further verified via computer modelling techniques and simulations. These tests demonstrated that performance increased with ski-jump angle, but planners chose to select the minimum angle, allegedly the reasoning behind this choice was to avoid placing excessive stress on the aircraft's undercarriage.

During the 1970s, the Royal Navy was considering the construction of a through-deck cruiser or light aircraft carrier, and decided to integrate the ski-jump into the project. Accordingly, the Invincible-class aircraft carriers were constructed with ski-jumps, greatly shortening the distance required for Harriers to take-off even when burdened with a useful payload. The ski-jump proved to be a relatively cheap and straightforward addition to the carriers, comprising steel construction without any moving parts. A ski-jump was added to the first carrier of the type, HMS Invincible, while she was fitting out in Barrow; it was set at a conservative 7° angle. On 30 October 1980, test pilot Lt Cdr David Poole conducted the first ski-jump assisted Harrier take-off at sea. HMS Illustrious was also initially fitted with a 7° ramp; however, HMS Ark Royal, was built with a 12° ramp from the outset, which was determined to be the optimum angle. The earlier two ships were subsequently retrofitted with 12° ramps to improve their aircraft's performance.

After the success of the Harrier, the ski-jump became a proven method for launching aircraft from ships without the complexity and expense of a catapult. Furthermore, later models of ski-jump feature refinements over the original design; it was determined that even relatively minor ruts or imperfections on an otherwise absolutely smooth surface were sufficient to precipitate cracking in an aircraft's landing gear. It is for this reason that the Royal Navy implemented more stringent design tolerances in the ramp specifications of the Queen Elizabeth-class aircraft carriers. It is possible for a modern ski-jump to be built as a single removable structure placed upon the forward flight deck, rather than being fully integrated into a ship's bow.

Ski-jumps were added not only to aircraft carriers, but also to numerous amphibious assault ships and landing helicopter docks to better facilitate the operation of STOVL aircraft. The Australian and Spanish Juan Carlos-class landing helicopter docks (LHDs) have also been outfitted with ski-jumps to facilitate potential STOVL operations. Somewhat unusually, the United States Navy has not ever used ski ramps onboard its amphibious assault ships, despite them being heavily used by VSTOL aircraft such as multiple models of the Harrier jump jet and Lockheed Martin F-35B Lightning IIs; this has been stated to be due to their operations involving combined use of helicopters and boats.

By the start of the twenty-first century, the British, Chinese, Indian, Italian, Russian, Spanish, and Thai navies all possessed aircraft carriers equipped with ski-ramps. Following the retirement of the Brazilian aircraft carrier São Paulo during 2017, the United States and France were the only two countries that still operated aircraft carriers with catapults.

== Aircraft carrier operations ==
=== STOBAR ===
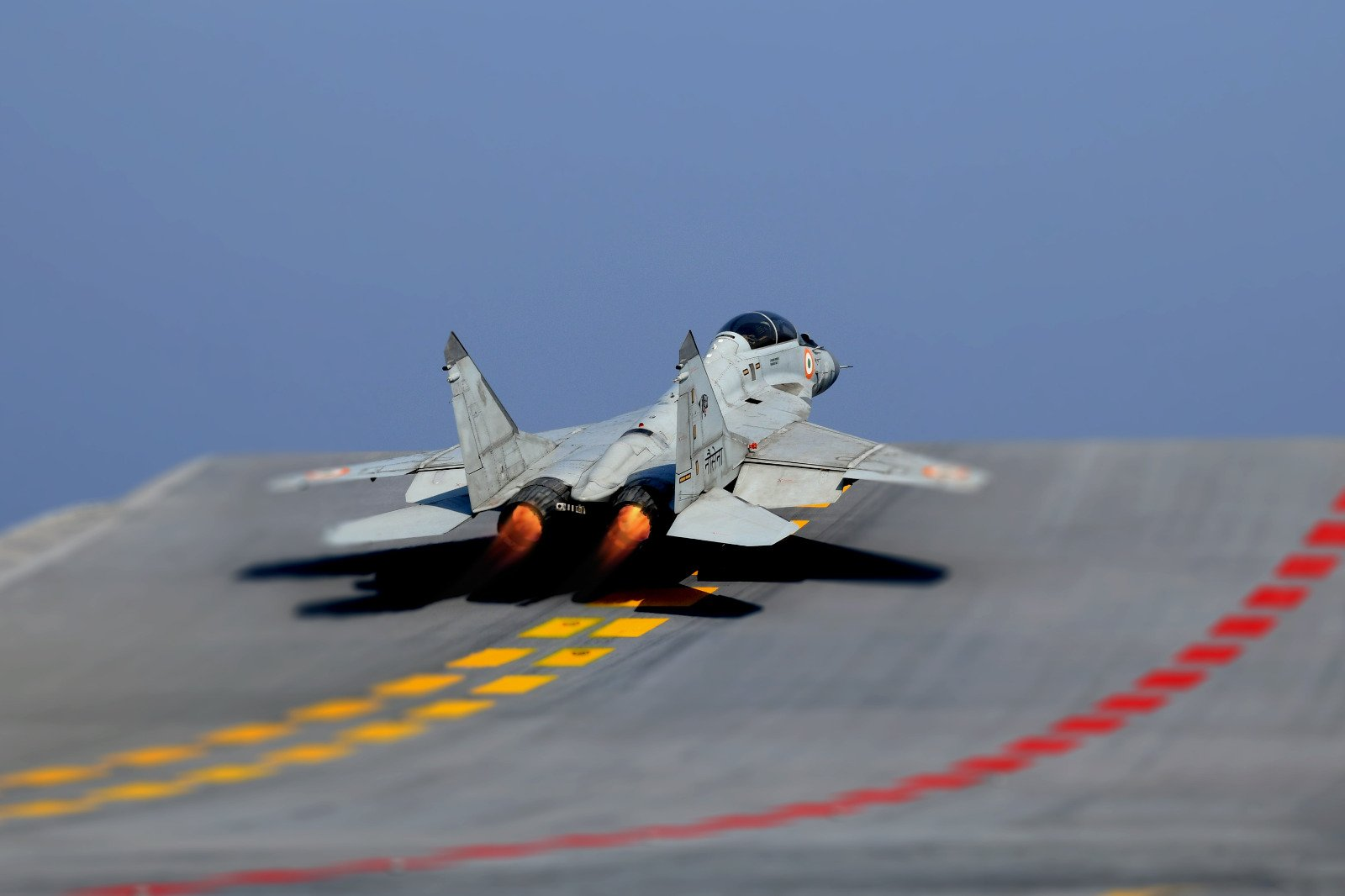
A MiG-29K launching from INS Vikrant

On Short Take-Off But Arrested Recovery aircraft carriers (STOBAR), conventional aircraft are launched using a ski-jump. The pilot increases the aircraft's thrust by switching on the afterburners, while holding the plane by braking. Two panels are raised from the deck of the aircraft carrier in front of the aircraft's main landing gear, ensuring the plane remains motionless. Upon command, the pilot releases the brake; the panels from the deck drop back into their slots; and the aircraft rapidly taxis forward under maximum thrust. Rolling over the ski ramp launches the plane both upward and forward.

A MiG-29 launching over the ski-jump ramp on a Kuznetsov-class aircraft carrier can take off at a speed of about 70 knots (130 km/h; 81 mph), instead of the usual 140 knots (260 km/h; 160 mph) (depending on many factors such as gross weight).

With the exception of the United States, France and China, every navy in the world that currently operates naval fixed-wing aircraft from carriers uses ski-jump ramps.

=== STOVL ===
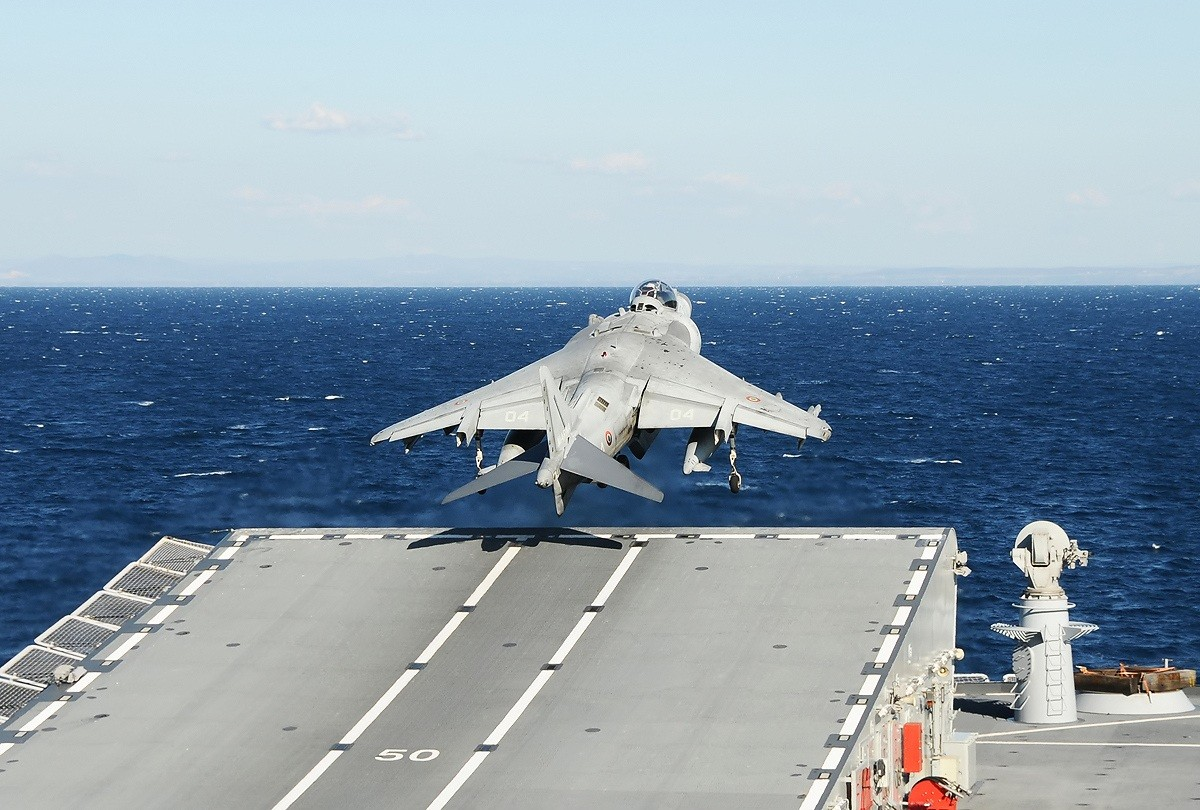
An AV-8B launches from the Italian Navy aircraft carrier Cavour

Short Take-Off, Vertical Landing aircraft (STOVL) make a conventional rolling takeoff, with the jet exhausts set to provide maximum forward thrust. As the plane nears the ski-jump ramp, the jet exhausts are rotated to provide lift as well as forward thrust. Such takeoffs allow a larger takeoff weight than an unassisted horizontal launch, because the ski-jump ramp provides a vertical impetus when most needed, right at takeoff at the slowest takeoff speed.

Ski-jump ramp takeoffs are considered to be safer than takeoffs over a flat-top carrier. When a Harrier launches from an American landing helicopter assault (LHA), it would finish its takeoff roll and begin flight at 60 ft (18 m) above the water. It might not have a positive rate of climb, especially if the ship had pitched nose down during the takeoff roll. Using a ski-jump ramp, a Harrier will certainly launch with a positive rate of climb, and its momentum will carry it to 150 to 200 ft (46 to 61 m) above the water.

In 1988, a detachment of US Marine Corps McDonnell Douglas AV-8B Harrier IIs conducted a series of flight tests on the Príncipe de Asturias. It was found that takeoff conditions which would use all 750 ft (230 m) of a Tarawa class's flight deck would only take 300 ft (91 m) with the Asturias's 12° ski-jump ramp; this dramatic improvement for a ship without catapults was described as "nothing short of amazing."

== Land operations ==
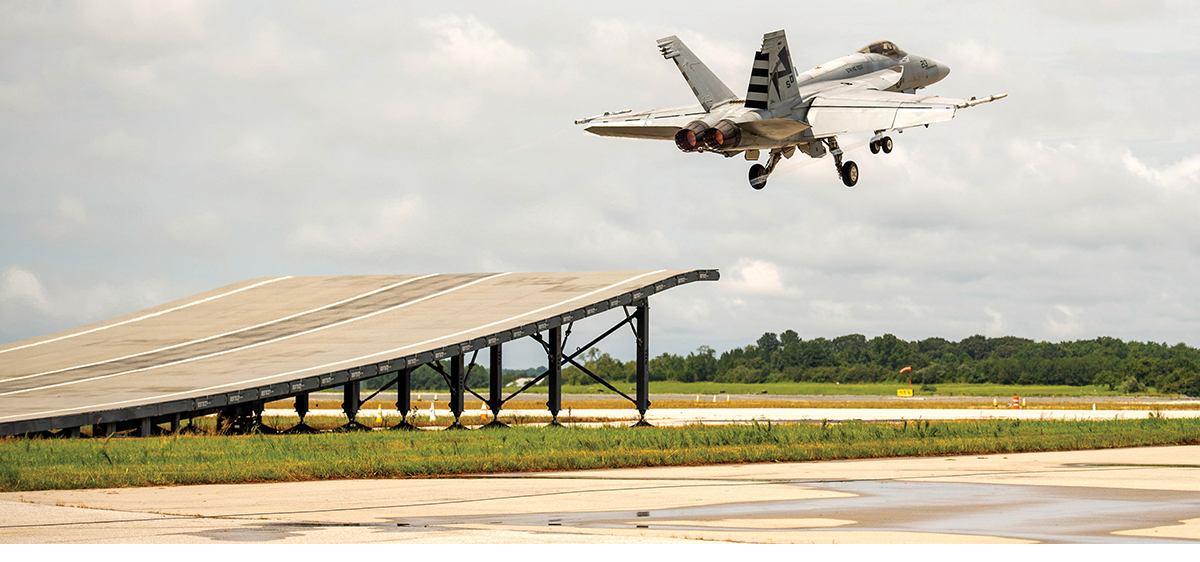
Super Hornet taking off from a ramp at NAS Pax River during demonstration.

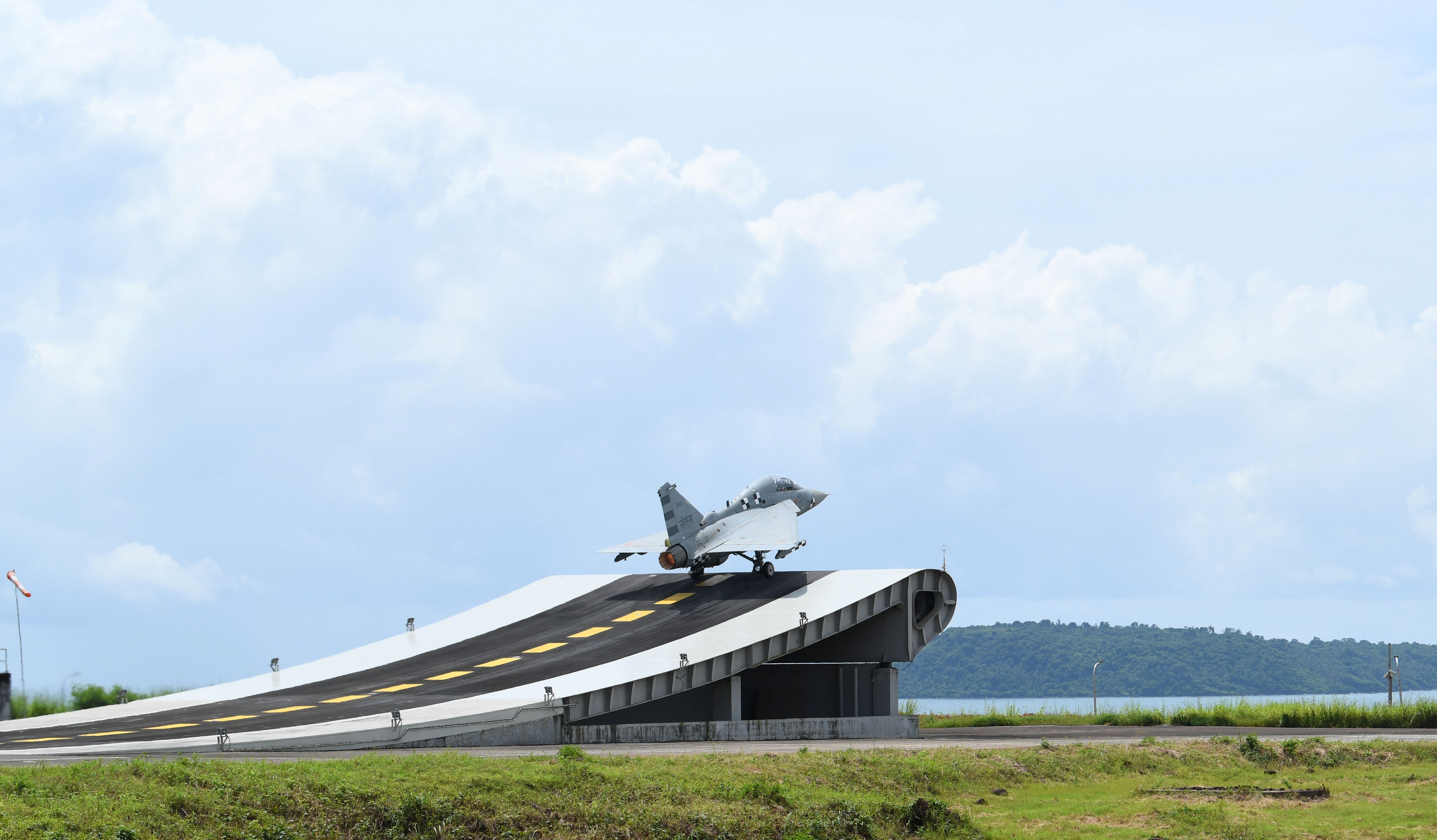
A prototype HAL Tejas taking off from a ramp at INS Hansa during flight testing.

During the early 1990s, the United States Air Force examined the use of ski-jumps on land to enable short-field takeoffs; the approach was viewed as "a possible solution to the runway denial problem in Europe" during the Cold War. It was determined that, when using a ski-jump with a nine degree angle of departure, the distance required for an McDonnell Douglas F/A-18 Hornet to takeoff would be reduced by roughly half.

== Ships/classes with ski-jumps ==
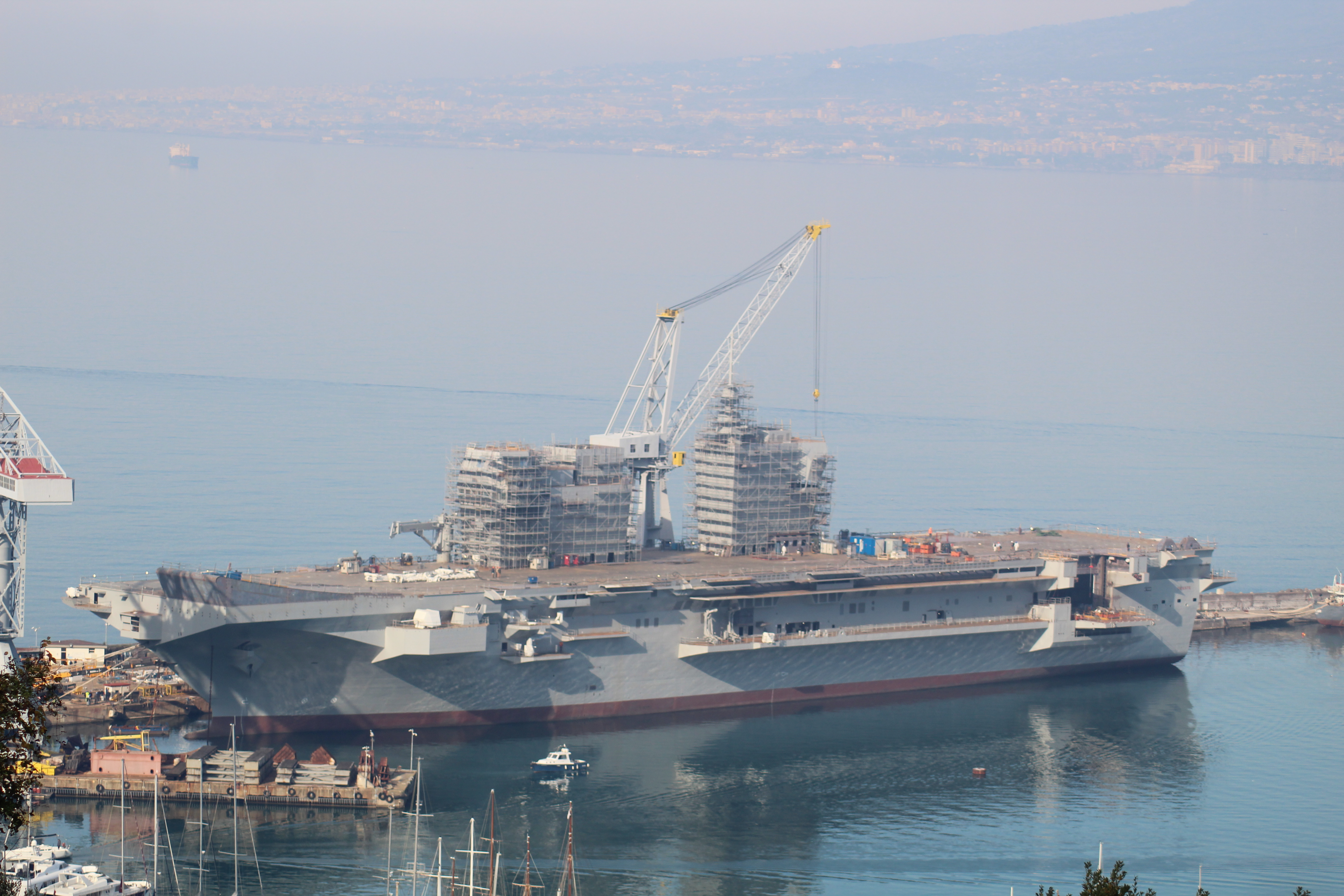
The Italian Trieste with ski-jump deck in 2020.

- Giuseppe Garibaldi (Italy)
- Cavour (Italy)
- Trieste (Italy)
- Hermes/Viraat (UK/India)
- Invincible-class aircraft carriers (UK)
- Queen Elizabeth-class aircraft carrier (UK)
- Príncipe de Asturias (Spain)
  - Chakri Naruebet (Thailand)
- Juan Carlos I (Spain)
  - Canberra-class landing helicopter docks (Australia)
  - Anadolu (Turkey)
- Kuznetsov-class aircraft carriers (Soviet Union/Russia/China)
  - Liaoning (China)
  - Shandong (China)
- Vikramaditya (India)
- Vikrant (R11) (India)

== See also ==
- Endless runway
- Rocket sled launch
