= Electromagnetic catapult =

Aircraft launching system

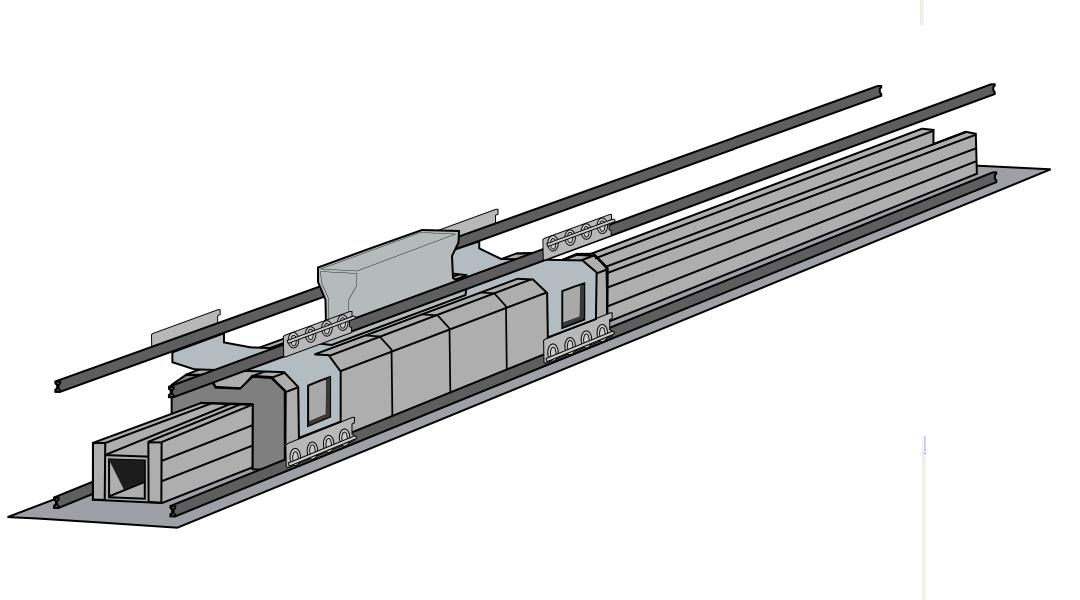

An electromagnetic catapult is a type of aircraft catapult that uses a linear induction motor system rather than the single-acting pneumatic cylinder (piston) system in conventional steam catapults. The system is typically used on aircraft carriers to launch fixed-wing carrier-based aircraft, employing the principles of electromagnetism and Lorentz force (similar to the propulsion used on maglev trains) to accelerate and assist their horizontal takeoff from the shorter flight deck runways.

Only the United States and China have successfully developed electromagnetic catapults, which are installed on the Gerald R. Ford-class aircraft carriers (currently only the lead ship CVN-78 being operational), the Type 003 aircraft carrier Fujian and the upcoming Type 076 amphibious assault ship Sichuan (51).

== Advantages ==
Electromagnetic catapults have several advantages over their older, superheated steam-based counterparts.

- Electromagnetic catapults are more compact and weigh less than steam catapults, which require complex piping, pump, pressure container, boiler and energy-intensive desalination (for fresh water boiling) systems below the flight deck, thus freeing up space for the hangar and equipment.
- Electromagnetic operation recharges via electric energy that is faster than the pressurization process of steam systems, where steam takes time to boil and accumulate.
- Electromagnetic catapults are configurable and can assign varying power to different sections of the catapult rail, allowing optimal acceleration to aircraft according to different payload weights and takeoff behaviours.
- Electromagnetic catapults do not suffer power loss with distance (where volume expansion within the steam catapult cylinder proportionally decreases pressure), temperature changes (which affects pressure according to ideal gas law) and fluid leakages (which matters in pressure vessels, but not in electromagnet systems).
- Electromagnetic acceleration is more uniform than steam acceleration, where force is highest initially and which creates a "jolt" at the start. It therefore reduces the impulsive stress upon the airframe, improving safety, endurance and maintenance costs for the aircraft.
- Electromagnetic systems are simpler and therefore cheaper to build with less maintenance.

== History ==
Developed in the 1950s, steam catapults have a proven history of reliability due to it being a mature technology. Carriers equipped with four steam catapults have been able to use at least one of them at 99.5% of the time. These have, however, several drawbacks. One group of Navy engineers wrote: "The foremost deficiency is that the catapult operates without feedback control. With no feedback, there often occurs large transients in tow forces that can damage or reduce the life of the airframe." The steam system is massive, inefficient (4–6%), and hard to control. These control problems allow Nimitz-class aircraft carrier steam-powered catapults to launch heavy aircraft, but not aircraft as light as many unmanned aerial vehicles.

In the United States, General Atomics Electromagnetic Systems (GA-EMS) developed the world's first operational modern electromagnetic catapult, named Electromagnetic Aircraft Launch System (EMALS), for the United States Navy. The system was installed on USS Gerald R. Ford and currently fitting-out USS John F. Kennedy, the lead ship and second ship of the new Gerald R. Ford-class supercarriers, replacing the traditional steam catapults on the retiring Nimitz class. The innovations on EMALS eliminate the traditional system requirements to desalinate, boil, convey and store steam, freeing up considerable area below deck. With the EMALS, Gerald R. Ford can accomplish 25% more aircraft launches per day than the Nimitz class and requires 25% fewer crew members. The EMALS uses a linear induction motor (LIM), which uses alternating current (AC) to generate magnetic fields that propel a carriage along a track to launch the aircraft. A system somewhat similar to EMALS, Westinghouse's electropult, was developed in 1946 but not deployed.

In China, the China Shipbuilding Industry Corporation and the Chinese Academy of Engineering have jointly developed an electromagnetic catapult system in the 2000s for the People's Liberation Army Navy's aircraft carrier programme, but with a different technical approach. The Chinese adopted a medium-voltage, direct current motor-supercapacitor propulsion system, instead of the alternating current motor-flywheel catapult system that United States developed for the Gerard R. Ford class. The system first installed on the aircraft carrier Fujian, and video footages of catapult launch tests of the J-15T, J-35 and KJ-600 aircraft during its seventh sea trial was officially released on September 22, 2025, making the ship the first aircraft carrier in the world confirmed to launch fifth-generation fighters successfully using an electromagnetic catapult system.

The concept of a ground carriage is intended for civilian use and takes the idea of an electromagnetic aircraft launch system one step further, with the entire landing gear remaining on the runway for both takeoff and landing.

== Operational systems ==
=== United States ===
General Atomics had designed a proprietary electromagnetic catapult system called the Electromagnetic Aircraft Launch System (EMALS) for the Gerald R. Ford-class aircraft carrier. A proposal to retrofit it into Nimitz-class carriers was rejected. John Schank said: "The biggest problems facing the Nimitz class are the limited electrical power generation capability and the upgrade-driven increase in ship weight and erosion of the center-of-gravity margin needed to maintain ship stability."

On 28 July 2017, Lt. Cmdr. Jamie "Coach" Struck of Air Test and Evaluation Squadron 23 (VX-23) performed the first EMALS catapult launch from USS Gerald R. Ford (CVN-78) in an F/A-18F Super Hornet.

By April 2021, 8,000 launch/recovery cycles had been performed with the EMALS and the Advanced Arresting Gear (AAG) system aboard USS Gerald R. Ford. The USN also stated that the great majority of these cycles had occurred in the prior 18 months and that 351 pilots had completed training on the EMALS/AAG. USS Gerald R. Ford was certified for flight deck operations using the EMALS in 2022.

On August 13, 2026, a White House presidential memorandum issued by 47th President Donald J. Trump called for replacing the EMALS and Advanced Weapons Elevators with steam catapult and hydraulic systems for the planned 4th Gerard R. Ford-class carrier USS Doris Miller (CVN-81), effective within 60 days of the memorandum. Trump, who previously referred to electromagnetic catapults as "digital" or "stupid electric", has been openly expressing his preference for steam catapults over EMALS since a Time interview in May 2017. Trump's directive has since come under scrutiny and criticism by the mainstream media and naval experts, who have called it "very old thinking" and "potential logistical nightmare".

=== China ===
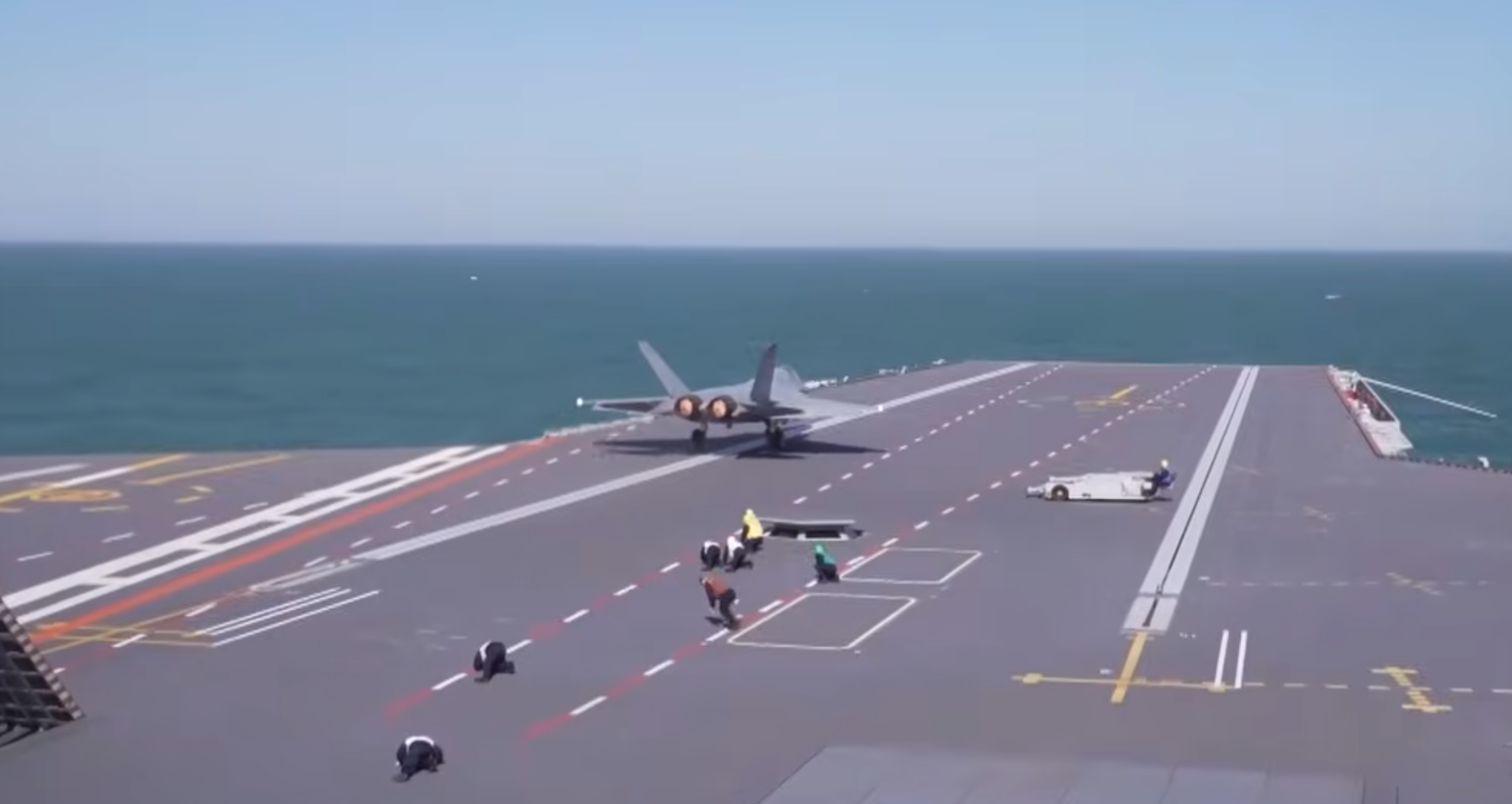
PLA Navy Shenyang J-35 being launched via electromagnetic catapults onboard the aircraft carrier Fujian

The first two ships of the Chinese aircraft carrier programme, the Type 001 Liaoning and Type 002 Shandong, are STOBAR carriers relying on a bow ski-jump to launch aircraft, as both are modified variants of the Soviet Kuznetsov-class. China has previously acquired elements of steam catapult technology by reverse-engineering the BS4 system on decommissioned Royal Australian Navy carrier HMAS Melbourne, which was sold to China for scrapping in 1985, leading many to believe subsequent Chinese aircraft carriers might have steam catapults.

In 2013, Rear Admiral Yin Zhuo of the People's Liberation Army Navy said that China's third aircraft carrier, the Type 003, would employ an electromagnetic catapult system, instead of a steam catapult as previously assumed. Multiple prototypes of aircraft catapults were spotted by the media in 2012, and aircraft capable of electromagnetic launching were undergoing testing at a Chinese Navy research facility.

According to a report in July 2017, construction of Type 003, which started at the Jiangnan Shipyard in 2015, was rescheduled in order to finalize on the choice between steam or electromagnetic catapult, and the latest competition results showed electromagnetic system won out and would be used on Type 003. In 2021, the electromagnetic catapult was confirmed installed on Type 003, now renamed Fujian, making it currently the only aircraft carrier besides the U.S. Navy's Gerald R. Ford-class to deploy such technology. The electromagnetic catapult system of Fujian is a medium-voltage direct-current (MVDC) linear motor system powered by a supercapacitor integrated power supply — the first of its kind in the world, which is allegedly more reliable compared to the AC motor–flywheel-based Electromagnetic Aircraft Launch System (EMALS) of the American Gerald R. Ford-class.

Fujian was launched in June 2022 and began sea trials in May 2024. By May 2025, she had completed eight sea trials, including takeoff and landing tests with J-15T heavy multirole fighters, J-35 stealth fighters and KJ-600 AEW&C aircraft. In August 2025, Chinese media released a video teasing the launch of the Shenyang J-15T variant on the Fujian with electromagnetic catapults. Though no complete sequence of the take-off and recovery was shown, analysts believed the carrier and its air wing were reaching an important milestone. On 22 September 2025, the Chinese state broadcaster released multiple videos and photos — suspected to be from Fujian's seventh sea trial earlier in the year — showing the complete catapult launch and arrestor recovery (CATOBAR) sequence for J-15T, J-35 and KJ-600 aircraft on the Fujian. PLA Navy also announced that Fujian had achieved "initial full-deck operational capability", laying the foundation for the subsequent integration with the carrier aviation wing and the carrier battle group.

The planned Type 004 aircraft carrier, a suspected class of nuclear-powered supercarrier with displacement up to 120,000 tonnes, whose yet-unnamed lead ship was laid down in 2024 and currently in construction at the Dalian Shipyard, will almost certainly be also equipped with electromagnetic catapults due to the success of the MVDC system on Fujian. The Type 004 is projected to have four electromagnetic catapults (two at the bow, two at the angled flight deck), compared to three on its Type 003 predecessor.

An electromagnetic catapult is also installed on the upcoming Type 076 amphibious assault ship along with an arresting gear system, enabling the LHD ship to also function as a drone carrier for unmanned combat aerial vehicles (UCAVs) and possibly even manned carrier-based aircraft. The lead ship of the Type 076, named Sichuan, was launched at the Hudong Shipyard in December 2024 and is currently undergoing sea trials, expected to be commissioned around late 2026.

== Systems under development ==
=== India ===
In 2013, the Indian Navy reportedly sought to equip the aircraft carrier with electromagnetic catapult, which could enable the launching of larger aircraft as well as unmanned combat aerial vehicles.

As per August 2024 media report, Research & Development Establishment (Engineers) has developed a scaled-down technology demonstrator, known as Electro-Magnetic Launch System (EMLS) capable of launching payloads up to 400 kilograms (880 lb) (equivalent to an unmanned aerial vehicle) over a short span of 16 to 18 metres (52 to 59 ft). The demonstrator is being further developed into a full-scale EMLS for application on future aircraft carriers. Industry partners were reportedly being sought to develop the full-scale system to launch platforms weighing up to 40 tons can be handled by the system. Two crucial technologies including Pulse Power (which controls the electromagnetic catapult's power requirements and ensures precise and dependable launches) and Linear Electric Machine (which produces the electromagnetic force required to launch aircraft) were successfully developed.

=== Russia ===
Russia's United Shipbuilding Corporation (USC) is developing new launch systems for warplanes based on aircraft carriers, USC President Alexei Rakhmanov told TASS on 4 July 2018.

== Ships with electromagnetic catapult ==
=== United States ===
- Gerald R. Ford-class aircraft carrier (in service)

=== China ===
- Chinese aircraft carrier Fujian (in service)
- Type 076 landing helicopter dock (launched)
- Type 004 aircraft carrier (under construction)

=== France ===
- Future French aircraft carrier (planned)

=== Russia ===
- Project 23000 (proposed)

=== India ===
- INS Vishal (proposed)

== See also ==
- Coilgun
- Electromagnetic Aircraft Launch System
- Mass driver
- Modern United States Navy carrier air operations
- Naval aviation
- Railgun
