= Chinese aircraft carrier programme =

Overview of the PRC aircraft carrier program

Active carriers of the PLAN
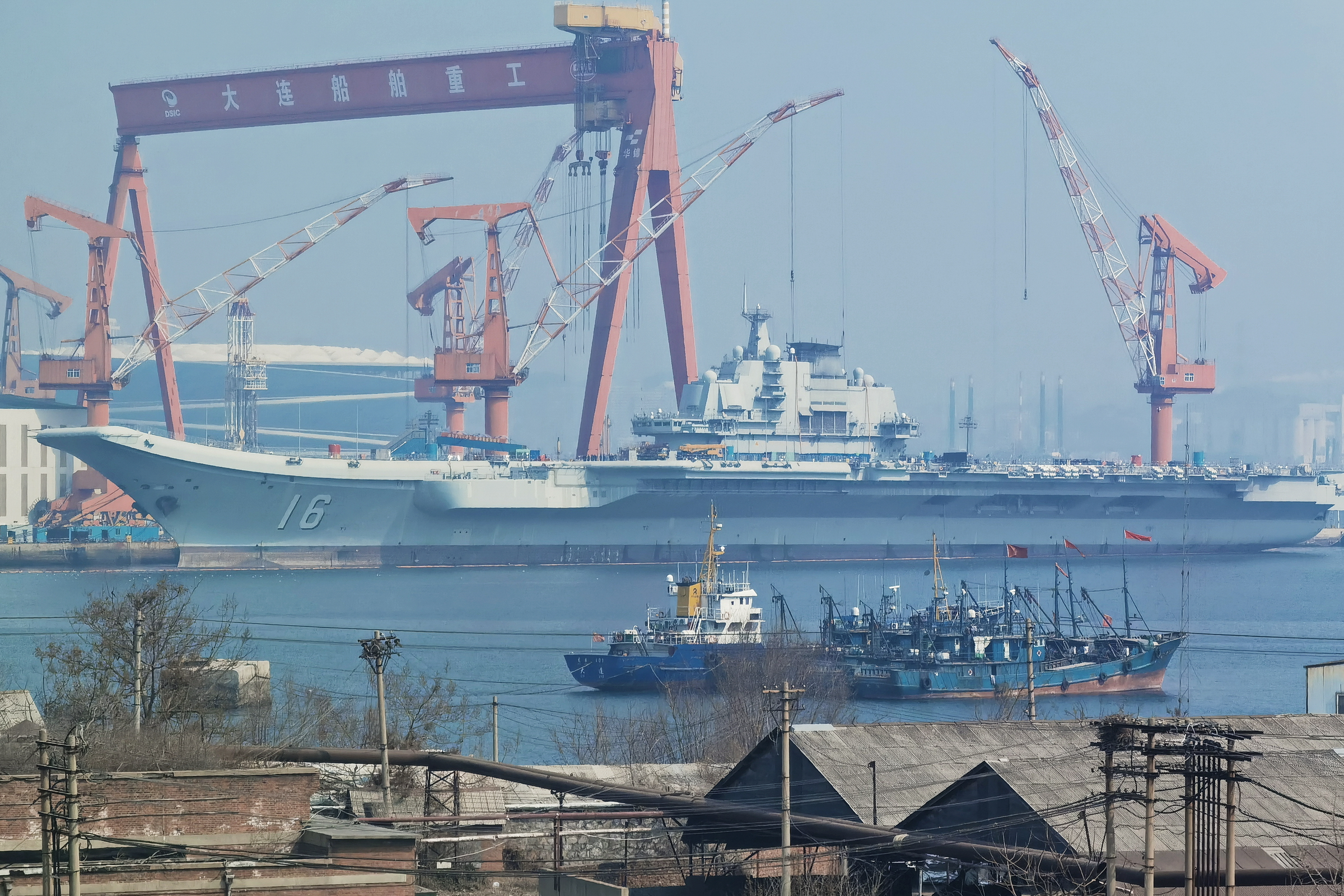
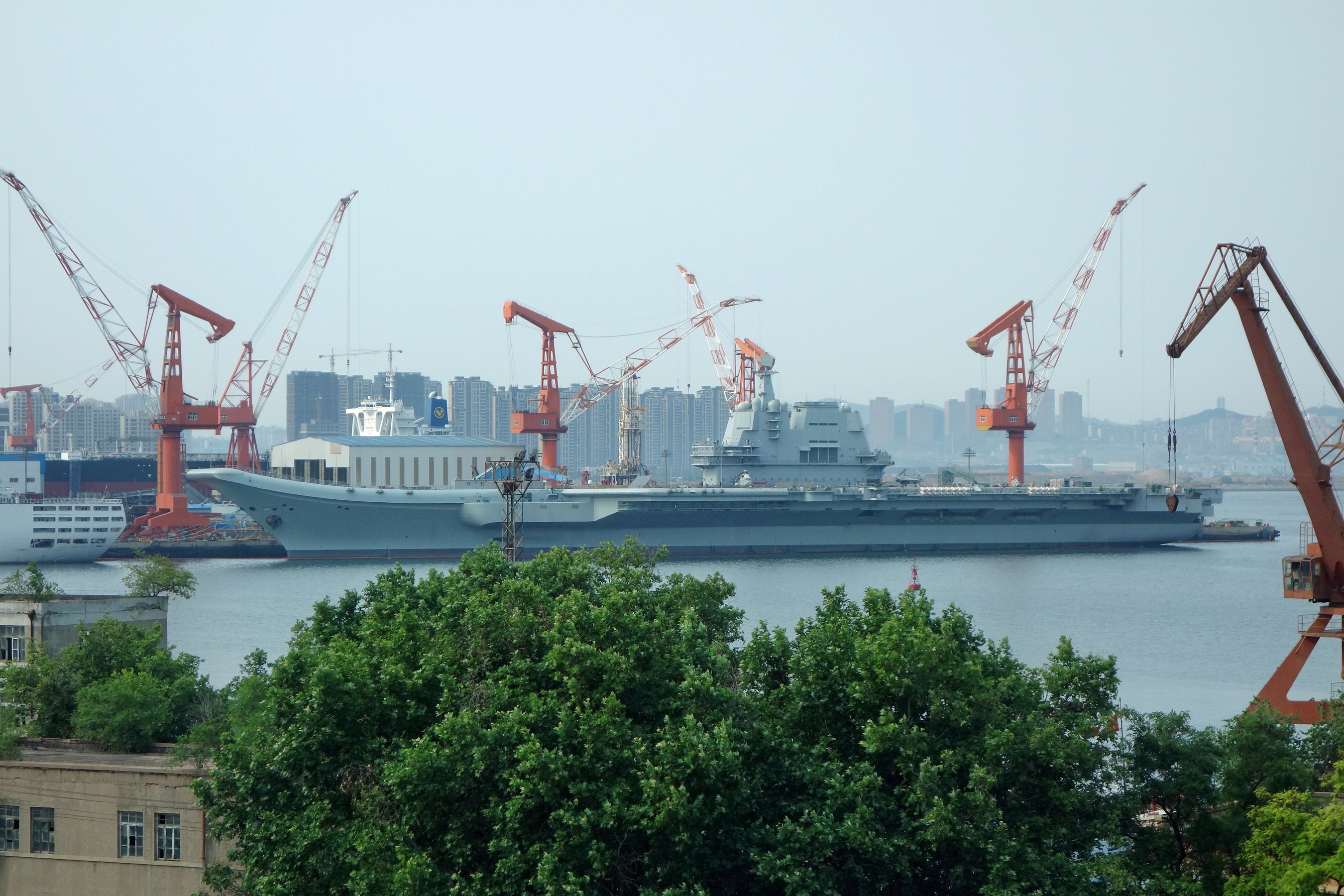
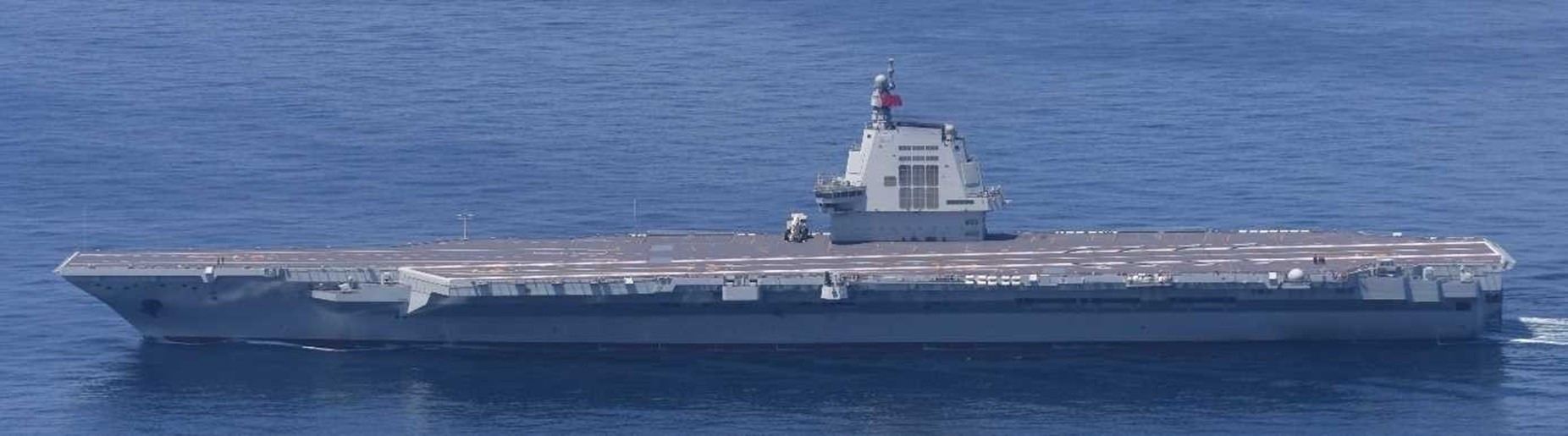
Top to bottom:
Type 001 Liaoning (16), China's first aircraft carrier docked at the DSIC Shipyard in April 2023; Type 002 Shandong (17), China's second aircraft carrier, docked at the DSIC Shipyard in 2019 prior to commissioning; Type 003 Fujian (18), China's third aircraft carrier, transiting the East China Sea, September 2025

As of 2026, the People's Republic of China has three active aircraft carriers in the Surface Force of the People's Liberation Army Navy (PLAN), namely the Liaoning, Shandong and Fujian. A fourth carrier, currently called "Type 004" and thought to feature nuclear propulsion, has been under construction since 2024. Wang Yunfei, a retired PLA Navy officer, and other naval experts projected in 2018–2019 that China might possess five or six aircraft carriers by the 2030s. In December 2025, the US Defense Department reported that China was planning on acquiring 9 aircraft carriers by 2035.

Aircraft carriers had long been an essential component of PLAN's ambition of becoming a blue-water navy, and China had attempted to acquire and study aircraft carriers since the 1970s. In the years after 1985, China acquired four retired aircraft carriers for research and reverse-engineering, namely the British-built Australian light carrier HMAS Melbourne and the ex-Soviet "aircraft-carrying cruisers" Minsk, Kiev and Varyag. The Varyag, which use a ski-jump flight deck for STOBAR operations, later underwent an extensive refit to be converted into the Liaoning, China's first operational aircraft carrier, which also served as a basis for China's subsequent design iterations in her indigenously built sister ship Shandong. The third carrier Fujian, launched in 2022, uses an indigenously developed electromagnetic catapult system for CATOBAR operations.

== History ==
=== Early ambitions ===
In the late 1920s, Chen Shaokuan, a Fleet Admiral of the Kuomintang-era navy, strongly advocated for aircraft carriers for the navy despite the cost of acquiring even a single carrier far exceeding the already poor economic and industrial capabilities of China at that time, repeatedly asking Chiang Kai-shek to fund an ambitious fleet of carriers.

Since the 1970s, the PLAN had expressed interest in operating an aircraft carrier as part of its blue water aspirations. To prepare the commanders needed for the future aircraft carriers, the Central Military Commission approved the program of training jet fighter pilots to be future captains in May 1987, and the Guangzhou Naval Academy was selected as the site.

=== Acquisition of HMAS Melbourne in 1985 ===
China acquired the decommissioned Majestic-class light aircraft carrier HMAS Melbourne in February 1985, when it was sold by the Royal Australian Navy (RAN) to the China United Shipbuilding Company to be broken up for scrap. The British-built CATOBAR carrier, who had never seen active combat operations, was removed from RAN service in mid-1982 due to the ongoing high maintenance costs and its jinxed reputation involving a number of serious maritime incidents, including the collision and sinking of two allied destroyers HMAS Voyager and USS Frank E. Evans during peacetime naval exercises. Prior to the ship's departure for China, the RAN stripped Melbourne of all electronic equipment and weapons, and welded her rudders into a fixed position so that she could not be reactivated, but her steam catapult, arresting gears and optical landing system were not removed. At this time, few western experts expected that the Chinese would attempt to develop aircraft carriers in the future.

Melbourne departed Sydney Harbour via towboat on 27 April 1985 and arrived in Huangpu Port, Guangzhou on 13 June. The ship was not scrapped immediately; instead she was studied by Chinese naval architects and engineers. It is unclear whether the People's Liberation Army Navy (PLAN) orchestrated the acquisition of Melbourne or simply took advantage of the situation; Rear Admiral Zhang Zhaozhong, a staff member at the National Defence College, has stated that the Navy was unaware of the purchase until Melbourne first arrived at Guangzhou. Melbourne was the largest warship any of the Chinese experts had seen, and they were surprised by the amount of equipment which was still in place. The PLAN subsequently arranged for the ship's flight deck and all the CATOBAR equipment to be removed so that they could be studied in depth. Reports have circulated that either a replica of the flight deck, or the actual deck itself, was used for training of People's Liberation Army Navy Air Force (PLANAF) pilots in carrier-based flight operations.

Chinese engineers reverse-engineered a land-based replica of the steam catapult and landing system from that of Melbourne, and a J-8IIG interceptor was used to conduct takeoff and landing trials on the land-based flight deck in April 1987, which was not finally confirmed officially until 27 years later in April 2014 by CCTV-13. Both the takeoff and landing were conducted on the same day, and the test pilot was PLANAF pilot Li Guoqiang. The experience gained would be later applied to the development of the J-15 multirole fighter.

It has also been claimed that the Royal Australian Navy received and "politely rejected" a request from the PLAN for blueprints of the ship's steam catapult. The carrier was not dismantled for many years; according to some rumours she was not completely broken up until 2002.

=== Other acquisition attempts: 1995–2000 ===
China also negotiated with Spain in an effort purchase the blueprints for proposed conventional take off/landing ships from Empresa Nacional Bazán, specifically 23,000-ton SAC-200 and 25,000-ton SAC-220 designs. Negotiations started between 1995 and 1996 but did not result in any purchase. However, the Spanish firm was paid several million US dollars in consulting fees, indicating the probable transfer of some design concepts.

China acquired the former Soviet Kiev-class aircraft carriers Minsk in 1995 and Kiev in 2000. Minsk, along with its sister ship Novorossiysk, were initially sold to South Korea in 1995 to be scrapped, but due to objections from environmentalists, Minsk was resold to China in 1998 to be broken up there instead, while Novorossiysk was scrapped in Korea in 1997. Kiev, likewise, was sold to China in 2000 by Russia with a contractual requirement for it to be scrapped. However, neither ship was dismantled and both were instead converted into tourist attractions, with Minsk being planned to be turned into a theme park and Kiev a luxury hotelship.

In 1997, China attempted to purchase the retired French aircraft carrier Clemenceau, but negotiations between China and France failed.

=== Planning phase: 2007–2011 ===
In mid-2007, Chinese domestic sources revealed that China had purchased a total of four sets of aircraft carrier landing systems from Russia and this was confirmed by Russian manufacturers. However, experts disagreed on the usage of these systems: while some have claimed that it is a clear evidence of the construction of an aircraft carrier, others claim these systems are used to train pilots for a future ship. Reports initially claimed that up to two carriers based on the Varyag would be started by 2015.

According to the Nippon News Network (NNN), research and development on the planned carriers was to be carried out at a military research facility in Wuhan. NNN stated that the actual carriers would be constructed at Jiangnan Shipyard in Shanghai. Kanwa Intelligence Review reported that the second carrier to be constructed would likely be assigned to Qingdao.

According to a February 2011 report in The Daily Telegraph, the Chinese military has constructed a concrete aircraft carrier flight deck to use for training carrier pilots and carrier operations personnel. The deck was constructed on top of a government building near Wuhan (Wuhan Technical College of Communication campus next to Huangjiahu). On 7 June 2011, People's Liberation Army Chief of the General Staff Chen Bingde confirmed that China was constructing its own aircraft carrier. He stated he would provide no further details until it was complete.

On 30 July 2011, a senior researcher of the Academy of Military Sciences said China needed at least three aircraft carriers. "If we consider our neighbours, India will have three aircraft carriers by 2014 and Japan will have three carriers by 2014, so I think the number (for China) should not be less than three so we can defend our rights and our maritime interests effectively." General Luo Yuan. In July 2011, a Chinese official announced that two aircraft carriers were being built at the Jiangnan Shipyard in Shanghai. On 21 May 2012, Taiwan's intelligence chief Tsai Teh-sheng told the Legislative Yuan that the PLA Navy plans to build two carriers, scheduled to start construction in 2013 and 2015 and launch in 2020 and 2022 respectively. The price of the two vessels is estimated to be worth $9 billion US dollars. On 24 April 2013, Chinese Rear Admiral Song Xue confirmed that China will build more carriers and these will be larger and will carry more aircraft than Liaoning.

== Overview of aircraft carriers ==
=== Liaoning (Type 001) ===
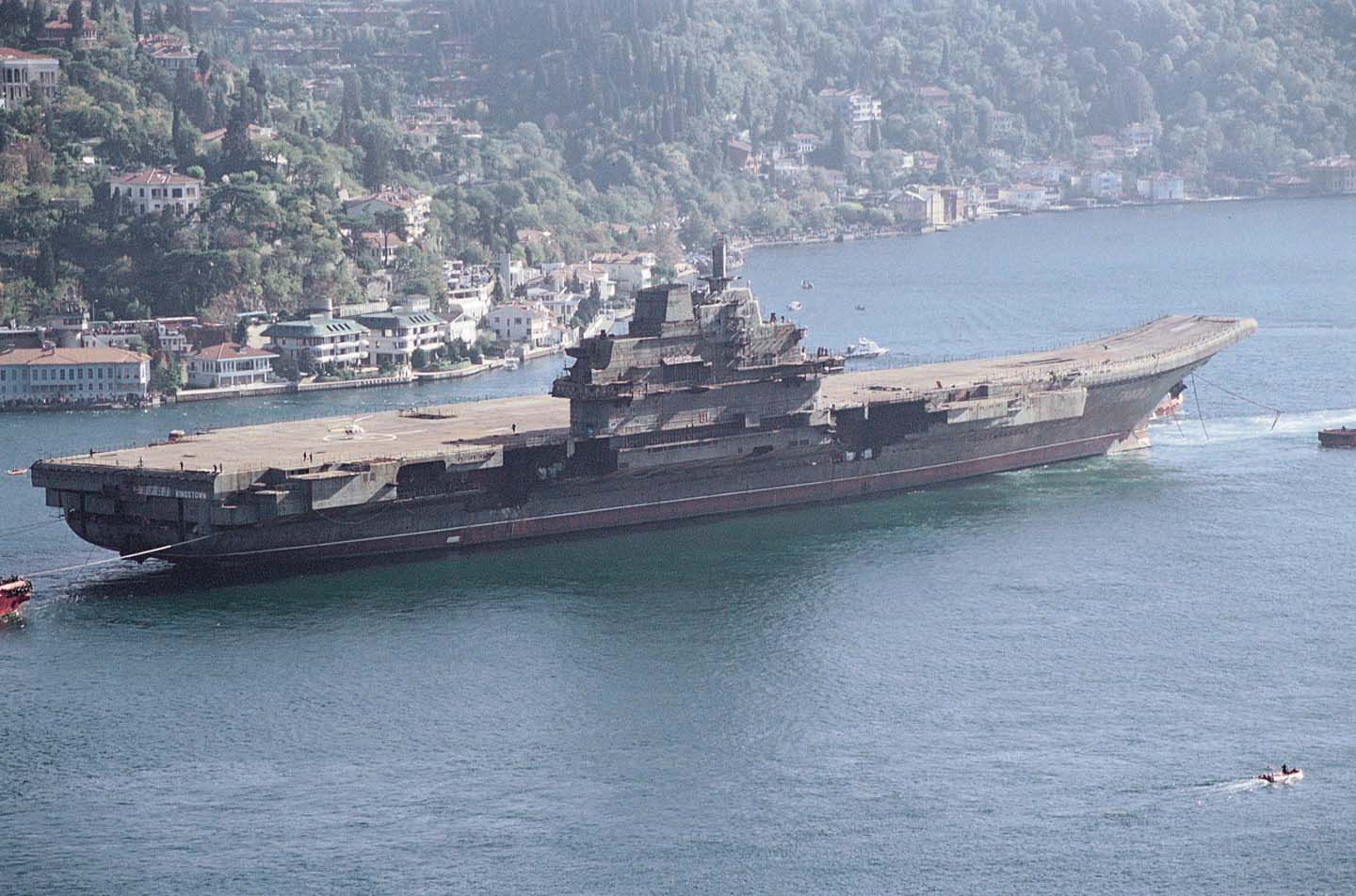
Liaoning before refurbishment

The 55,000-ton ex-Soviet Kuznetsov class aircraft carrier Varyag, originally intended for the Soviet Navy and approximately 68% complete, was left moored in Black Sea Shipyard, Ukraine after the dissolution of the Soviet Union. In 1998, the ship, with only the hull completed and no propulsion system, was purchased by a private shell company based in Macau under the pretext of establishing a floating casino. Prior to the sale, Varyag had been stripped of all installed military equipment.

After a challenging 21-month towed journey through the Black Sea, Mediterranean, Atlantic Ocean, Indian Ocean, and the South and East China Sea, Varyag finally arrived at Dalian in Northeast China on 3 March 2002. After docking in the Dalian Shipyard for more than three years, the ship was finally transferred to dry dock in June 2005 and underwent a lengthy refurbishment. In 2007, news reports indicated the ship was being fitted out for potential naval service.

In 2011, People's Liberation Army Chief of the General Staff Chen Bingde confirmed that China was constructing at least one aircraft carrier. On 10 August 2011, Chinese authorities announced that the refurbishment of Varyag had been completed and that the ship was undergoing sea trials.

On 14 December 2011, the American satellite imaging company DigitalGlobe announced that it had identified the refitted Varyag at sea in imagery taken on 8 December. The vessel was seen operating in the Yellow Sea over a period of five days.

On 23 September 2012, the carrier was officially renamed Liaoning, after Liaoning province where the ship gained her new life, and was formally handed over to the People's Liberation Army Navy (PLAN), although the carrier was not yet considered fully operational. In November, the first successful takeoff and landing of a J-15 were conducted aboard Liaoning.

By November 2016, it was reported that Liaoning was combat-ready. Around the same time, China confirmed the construction of a second aircraft carrier based on indigenous modifications of Liaoning's designs. Like Liaoning, this second carrier — later named Shandong — uses a ski-jump ramp for STOBAR aviation operations.

=== Shandong (Type 002) ===
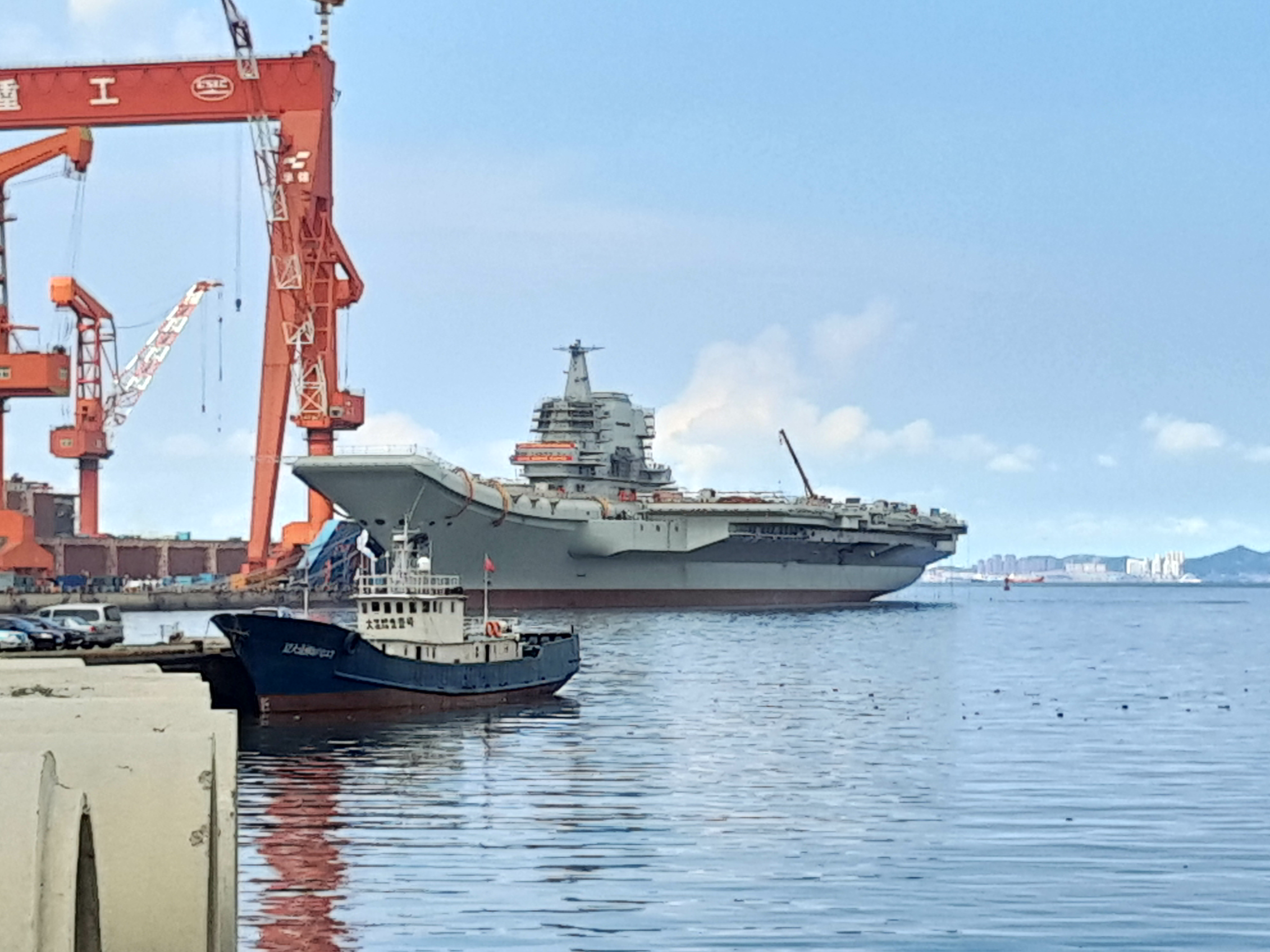
The Type 002 aircraft carrier in 2017

The Type 002, or Shandong, is China's first domestically produced aircraft carrier. Construction began in November 2013 at the Dalian Shipyard and the ship was launched on 26 April 2017. After being fitted out, China's first domestically produced aircraft carrier underwent nine sea trials over the course of 18 months, starting from May 2018. The ship was formally commissioned into service on 19 December 2019 as the Shandong, with pennant number "17".

The 002 is a conventionally powered ski-jump carrier with a displacement of around 70,000 tonnes. The ship is derived from the Liaoning. It uses conventional steam turbines with diesel generators as propulsion. The Shandong is a significant improvement over the Soviet-built Liaoning. For example, the Shandong carrier's ski-jump has an angle of 12.0°, an angle ideal for launching the Shenyang J-15 fighter, instead of the 14.0° on the Liaoning. Together with the enlarged hangar, the island, which has been reduced in overall size by 10%, and extended on sponsons in the aft-starboard quarter, space has been freed up allowing for up to eight more aircraft and helicopters to be carried. The island includes a second glazed deck which permits the bridge and flight control areas to be separate, creating greater operational efficiency. It also features a faceted upper area of four active electronically scanned arrays (AESAs) for the S-band Type 346 radar.

=== Fujian (Type 003) ===
The third aircraft carrier, known as Fujian, is an entirely different design from Liaoning and Shandong. It is the largest of China's current fleet. The Type 003 has a displacement of over 80,000 tonnes but is smaller in size than the US Navy's Ford Class ships.

Construction began in the mid-2010s. The National Interest reported it began March 2015. In 2015, media reports stated that both an electromagnetic catapult and a steam-powered catapult were constructed at the Huangdicun naval base for testing; this was thought at the time to indicate that the Type 003 class as well as future PLAN carriers would possibly be CATOBAR carriers.

The construction of the first Type 003 class aircraft carrier started in February 2017. Satellite observation at the Jiangnan Shipyard in Shanghai only showed one carrier of this type under construction.

It was reported in early 2021 that the first ship would be launched in the same year, with construction already started on a second ship in this class. On 10 November 2021, Bloomberg reported that "China is three to six months away from launching its third aircraft carrier", citing a report by the Center for Strategic and International Studies. On 17 June 2022, the Type 003, now named Fujian was officially completed and launched. In January 2024, the Fujian was carrying out mooring tests in preparation for its maiden voyage.

On 1 May 2024, the Fujian officially commenced its first sea trial.

Fujian was officially commissioned at a ceremony in Sanya, Hainan on 5 November 2025. CCP General Secretary and Central Military Commission chairman Xi Jinping was in attendance at the commissioning and flag-presenting ceremony. Afterwards, he boarded for an inspection tour.

=== Type 004 ===
The Type 004 is planned to be larger than the Type 003, and also to feature nuclear propulsion. Construction possibly started in 2024, at the latest in September 2025. Like the Type 003 Fujian, it will feature an integrated electric propulsion system that will allow the operation of electromagnetic catapults. Based on the details of the Type 004 aircraft carrier, it is expected to be 10–20% larger than the US's Ford-class supercarriers, making it the largest aircraft carrier in the world, and its specifications indicate that it is being built to match or even rival the capabilities of the Ford-class supercarriers. In December 2025, the US Defense Department revealed that China was planning on constructing 6 Type 004 carriers by 2035, which would give them a total fleet size of 9 aircraft carriers, outnumbering the 6 carriers currently deployed in the US Pacific Fleet.

== Carrier-based aircraft ==
=== J-15 fighter ===
China initially, in the 2000s, intended to acquire Russian Sukhoi Su-33 carrier-based aircraft to be operated from its aircraft carriers. However, China later, starting in 2006, developed the Shenyang J-15 as a derivative of the Su-33, featuring Chinese technology and avionics from the J-11B program. On 25 November 2012, it was announced that at least two Shenyang J-15 aircraft had successfully landed on Liaoning. The pilot credited with having achieved the first landing was Dai Mingmeng.

According to Chinese media reports, the J-15 cannot take off from Liaoning with a full fuel and munition load, being unable to get off the carrier's ski jump-ramp if the payload exceeds 12 tonnes (26,000 lb).

In October 2024, an improved variant "J-15T" with CATOBAR launch capability, modern fifth-generation avionics, AESA radar, new airframes, stealth coatings, and compatibility to launch PL-10 and PL-15 missiles entered active service.

=== J-35 fighter ===
The Shenyang J-35 is a medium-sized fifth-generation stealth fighter that is also intended for carrier use (there is also a land-based variant). The South China Morning Post reported on 6 July 2018 that China was developing an upgraded variant of the FC-31, later called J-35, as an alternate carrier jet. The J-35 finally entered its production phase, and military service, in 2025.

=== KJ-600 early warning and control aircraft ===
The Xi'an KJ-600, which entered service in September 2025, is a high-straight wing AEW&C aircraft suspected to be fitted with an AESA-type radome system; it has a striking external resemblance to the aftward-folding Northrop Grumman E-2 Hawkeye, a carrier-based AEW&C aircraft serving the United States Navy. The design is likely to be a case of form following function, as the cancelled Soviet Yak-44 shared the same layout.

Analyst H. I. Sutton believed in 2020 that the KJ-600 would be a massive boost to the Chinese Navy, and would "greatly enhance the aerial and maritime situational awareness, and the offensive and defensive capabilities of the carrier group", and that "Chinese aerospace and military industry has certainly shown its ability to develop quite modern and capable AEW&C systems for other air, naval and ground applications".

== List of carriers ==
Hull number	Name	Class	Builder	Launched	Commissioned	Home port	Status
16	Liaoning	Type 001	Nikolayev Shipyard (Hull); Dalian Shipyard (Refit)	4 December 1988	September 2012	Yuchi Naval Base	Active
17	Shandong	Type 002	Dalian Shipyard	26 April 2017	December 2019	Yulin Naval Base	Active
18	Fujian	Type 003	Jiangnan Shipyard	17 June 2022	5 November 2025	Yulin Naval Base	Active
		Type 004	Dalian Shipyard				Under construction

== See also ==
- Soviet aircraft carrier Ulyanovsk
- List of aircraft carriers in service
- DF-21D – Chinese anti-ship ballistic missile
