= Luo Yang =

Luo Yang may refer to:

- Luo Yang (aircraft designer), Chinese aircraft designer (1961–2012)
- Luo Yang (photographer), Chinese photographer (born 1984)
- Luoyang, city in Henan, China
