= Shenyang J-15 =

Chinese fourth-generation carrier-based multirole fighter

J-15 Feisha (Flying Shark)
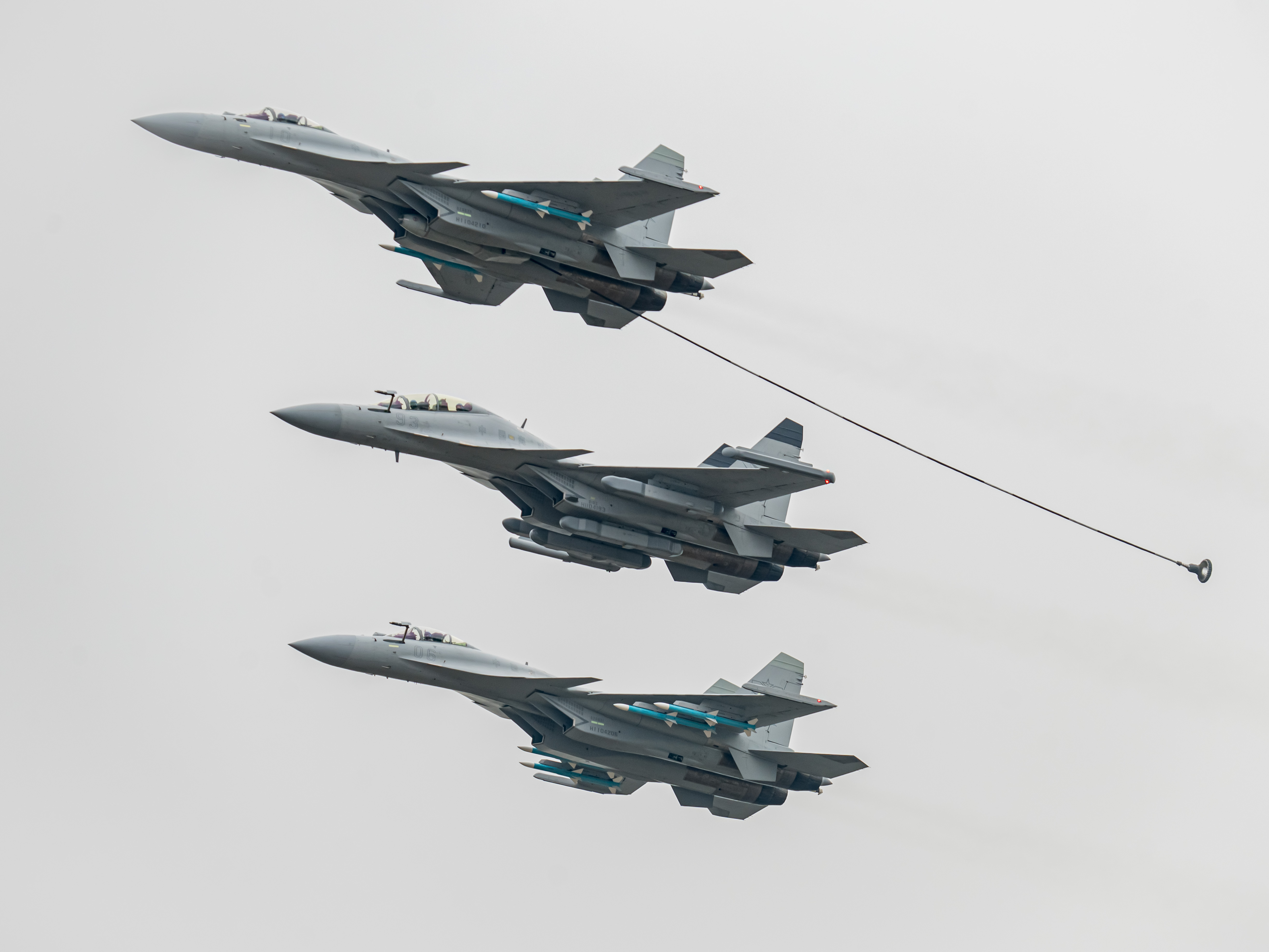
- Two J-15Ts and a J-15DH in Zhuhai Airshow 2024.

General information
- Type: Carrier-based multirole fighter
- National origin: China
- Manufacturer: Shenyang Aircraft Corporation
- Status: In service / In production
- Primary user: People's Liberation Army Naval Air Force
- Number built: 116+

History
- Manufactured: 2006–present
- Introduction date: J-15: December 2013; J-15S: July 2022; J-15T/J-15D: October 2024
- First flight: J-15: 31 August 2009; J-15S: 3 November 2012; J-15T: July 2016; J-15D: October 2016
- Developed from: T-10K; Shenyang J-11B

The Shenyang J-15 (Chinese: 歼-15; pinyin: Jiān-Shíwǔ), also known as Feisha (Chinese: 飞鲨; pinyin: fēi shā; lit. 'Flying Shark'; NATO reporting name: Flanker-X2, Flanker-K) is a Chinese all-weather, twin-engine, carrier-based 4.5 generation multirole fighter aircraft developed by the Shenyang Aircraft Corporation (SAC) and the 601 Institute, specifically for the People's Liberation Army Naval Air Force (PLANAF) to serve on People's Liberation Army Navy's (PLAN) aircraft carriers.

The aircraft entered active service with the PLAN in 2013. An improved variant, named J-15T, incorporating CATOBAR launch capability, modern fifth-generation avionics, entered active service in the South China Sea in October 2024.

== Development ==
In 2001, China acquired the T-10K-3, an unfinished prototype of the Su-33, from Ukraine, and it is claimed that China studied the aircraft extensively and reverse-engineered it, with development on the J-15 beginning immediately afterward. Another pre-production aircraft, the T-10K-7, was sold to the Chinese by Ukraine 2004 and was of great use. These two airframes were two of the three that were left to Ukraine after the dissolution of the Soviet Union.

China had sought to purchase Su-33s from Russia on several occasions—an unsuccessful offer was made as late as March 2009—but negotiations collapsed in 2006 after it was discovered that China had developed a modified version of the Sukhoi Su-27SK, designated the Shenyang J-11B, in violation of intellectual property agreements.

However, according to Chinese sources, China withdrew from talks because Russia wanted large payments to reopen Su-33 production lines and insisted on a Chinese purchase of at least 50 Su-33s, which China was reluctant to buy, as it believed the aircraft would become outdated in a few years. China hence decided on an indigenous variant instead of continuing to assemble the J-11, the licensed Chinese version of Su-27.

The J-15 program was officially started in 2006 with the codename Flying Shark. The program goal was to develop a naval-capable fighter aircraft from the Shenyang J-11, with technologies reverse-engineered from T-10K-3, a Soviet Su-33 prototype that had been acquired from Ukraine.

On 31 August 2009, the first J-15 prototype made its maiden flight, believed to have been powered by Russian-supplied Saturn AL-31 turbofan engines. Video and still images of the flight were released in July 2010, showing the same basic airframe design as the Su-33.

On 7 May 2010, the aircraft conducted its first takeoff from a simulated ski-jump on land. On 21 October 2012, the J-15 performed first arresting landing on the Liaoning by Flight Test Establishment pilot, China's first operational aircraft carrier. On 20 November 2012, the first successful landing by a PLA Navy pilot was achieved. On 23 November 2012, two more Navy pilots landed the J-15 on the Liaoning carrier. On 25 November 2012, Chinese state media announced the J-15 had successfully performed its first takeoff and landing on Liaoning.

The twin-seat version of the Shenyang J-15, called J-15S, was developed in 2012. On 3 or 4 November 2012, the twin-seat the J-15S reportedly made its maiden flight.

In November 2012, Chinese state television showed the progress of integration training on the aircraft carrier Liaoning, with multiple J-15s performing landings and ramp-assisted take-offs.

In 2013, the first 24 J-15 aircraft were delivered to the Naval Aviation’s Carrier Fighter Group after completing the flight test. The first unit of the J-15 was handed over to the PLAN Carrier Fighter Group in late 2013.

In July 2016, the CATOBAR-capable J-15 prototype, designated J-15T, made its maiden flight, powered by two indigenous Shenyang WS-10H engines. The type began test flight at PLAN land-based catapult facilities.

In October 2016, the twin-seat electronic warfare (EW) variant, dubbed J-15D, reportely took maiden flight.

In May 2018, additional photos of J-15D in flight testing were published online, displaying development progress. Analysts noted the airframe was modified from the regular J-15 and shared similarities with China's previous electronic warfare aircraft, the J-16D, which was modified from a regular Shenyang J-16. The radome shape suggested the aircraft was mounted with an active electronically scanned array (AESA) radar.

Shenyang J-15 fighter jets on the aircraft carrier Liaoning, July 2017

In July 2018, PLAAF Lieutenant General Zhang Honghe reported that a carrier-based replacement for the J-15 was in development after two crashes and "mechanical failures". One issue was the limited payload due to the weight of the aircraft - the empty weight is 17,500 kg (38,600 lb) compared to the F/A-18E/F Super Hornet's 14,600 kg (32,200 lb) - and operating from a STOBAR carrier. However, Chinese aviation expert Andreas Rupprecht noted that the failure was not due to any possible flaws of the Shenyang J-15 platform, but increasing operation tempo during training and the limitation of the aircraft carrier Liaoning itself, which is too small for the heavy fighter like J-15. He believed that the potential of J-15 could only be realized through upgraded variants with new weaponry, the addition of CATOBAR launch capability, and a larger carrier platform such as the Type 003 aircraft carrier, which was under construction in 2018. Rupprecht also believed the J-15's retirement was unlikely, and the platform would continue to serve the crucial role of long-range weapon delivery platform alongside the navalized Shenyang FC-31 stealth aircraft (which finally went into service as the J-35) in the future.

In November 2020, Jane's reported that SAC had produced a second prototype of the J-15T fighter aircraft.

In 2021, analysts reported work on an upgraded variant with new avionics, engines, and CATOBAR launch capability. The upgrade variant of J-15 is capable of launching newer PL-10 and PL-15 missiles. The J-11D upgrade program reportedly contributed to the subsystems. The J-15B program, often called by this name in the media, was officially given the original name "J-15T" later.

In July 2022, the twin-seat J-15S entered limited service.

In November 2022, a production J-15 powered by the Shenyang WS-10, possibly the WS-10B, appeared in Chinese media. It was the last indigenous Chinese combat aircraft to replace the AL-31; possibly due to navalisation. According to Chinese observers, compared to the AL-31 the WS-10 had superior safety, reliability, and service life, aspects which are magnified by the constraints of carrier aviation.

In October 2024, the Shenyang J-15T CATOBAR-capable variant and the Shenyang J-15D electronic warfare (EW) variant have entered PLA Navy service. The J-15Ts, despite being a catapult-launched aircraft, were deployed on Liaoning and Shandong. The catapult-equipped Type 003 Fujian carrier had not yet become operational.

In August 2025, J-15D with CATOBAR launch capability, dubbed J-15DT, was observed in development and test flight.

On 22 September 2025, Chinese state media released footage of the Shenyang J-15T being launched and recovered on the Type 003 Fujian aircraft carrier, using Fujian's electromagnetic catapults.

== Design ==
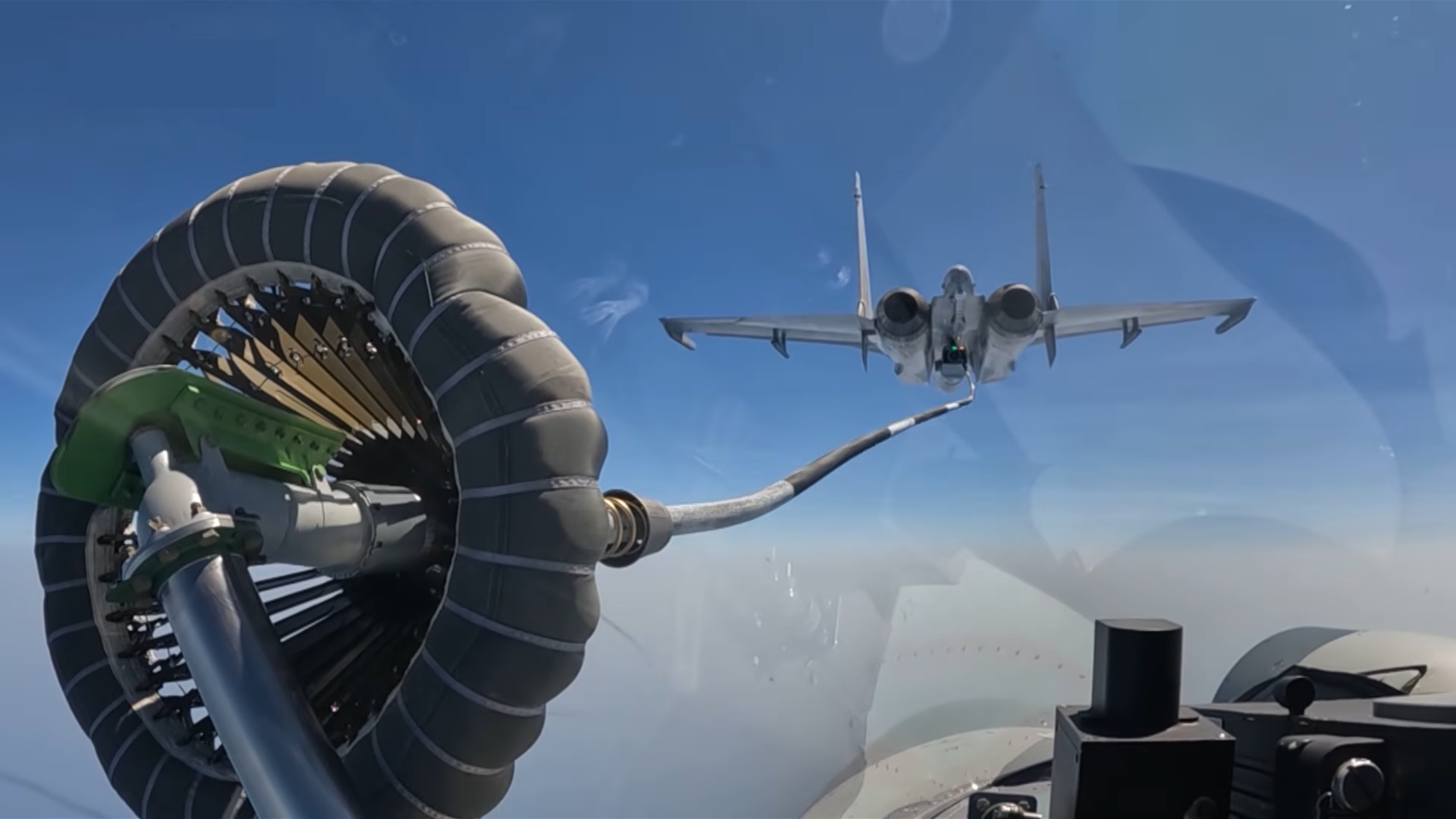
Shenyang J-15 buddy refueling

The J-15 appears to be structurally based on the prototype of Su-33, the fighter features indigenous Chinese technologies as well as avionics from the Shenyang J-11B program. The airframe of the J-15 is structurally reinforced for carrier landing and launching, with the addition of a tailhook and strengthened landing gears. The aircraft incorporated a higher portion of composite materials than the Sukhoi Su-33 to save weight and improve aerodynamic performance, allowing for a slower landing speed compared to the Su-33.

The J-15 utilizes the J-11B's glass cockpit, avionics, and Type 1493 PD radar, with enhanced air-to-surface capabilities for naval operations. The catapult-capable J-15T was upgraded with new sensors and J-11D's active electronically scanned array (AESA) radar, and it features a wide-angle HUD (Heads-Up Display).

The J-15 prototypes, including the original J-15 and J-15T, were tested with the Shenyang WS-10H engine; The early production aircraft use the Russian AL-31F engines, In 2012, Hu Siyuan of the PLA National Defense University said that "the current weak point of the J-15 is its Russian-made AL-31 engines, which are less powerful than that of the American F-35 fighter". The engines were swapped to Shenyang WS-10B in 2022.

An article in the China SignPost believes the J-15 "likely exceeds or matches the aerodynamic capabilities of virtually any fighter aircraft currently operated by regional militaries, except for the U.S. F-22 Raptor", alleging that the J-15 likely possesses a 10% greater thrust-to-weight ratio and 25% lower wing loading than the F/A-18E/F Super Hornet. However, one of the authors of that same article described the J-15 in another article as no game changer; the reliance on ski-jump launches and lack of Chinese carrier-based aerial refueling capabilities are believed to greatly reduce its effective combat range. In 2014, it was revealed that the J-15 is capable of aerial refueling, using the UPAZ-1 buddy refueling pod, which can be carried by another J-15.

The J-15's chief designer, Sun Cong of the National Committee of the Chinese People's Political Consultative Conference, has said that the J-15 could match the F/A-18 in bomb load, combat radius, and mobility. However, in a similar statement, he said more work was required on its electronics and combat systems. Rear Admiral Yin Zhuo stated that the aircraft's air combat capabilities were better than that of the F/A-18E/F Super Hornet. However, he also stated that its ability to attack land and sea targets was slightly inferior to the F/A-18E/F; it is also stated that its electronic equipment meets the standards of those on a fifth-generation fighter.

The J-15 may be operating from the aircraft carrier Liaoning and Shandong. The J-15 can take off from the carrier's ski-jump front deck, known as the STOBAR (Short Take-Off but Barrier Recovery) operation. The catapult launch-capable J-15T features significantly reinforced and re-engineered front landing gear attached with a catapult launch bar. The J-15T can take off from the aircraft catapult, known as the CATOBAR (Catapult-Assisted Take-Off Barrier Recovery) operation. The J-15T can also launch from an older carrier's ski-jump if needed, offering operational flexibility.

== Operational history ==
=== Flight testing ===
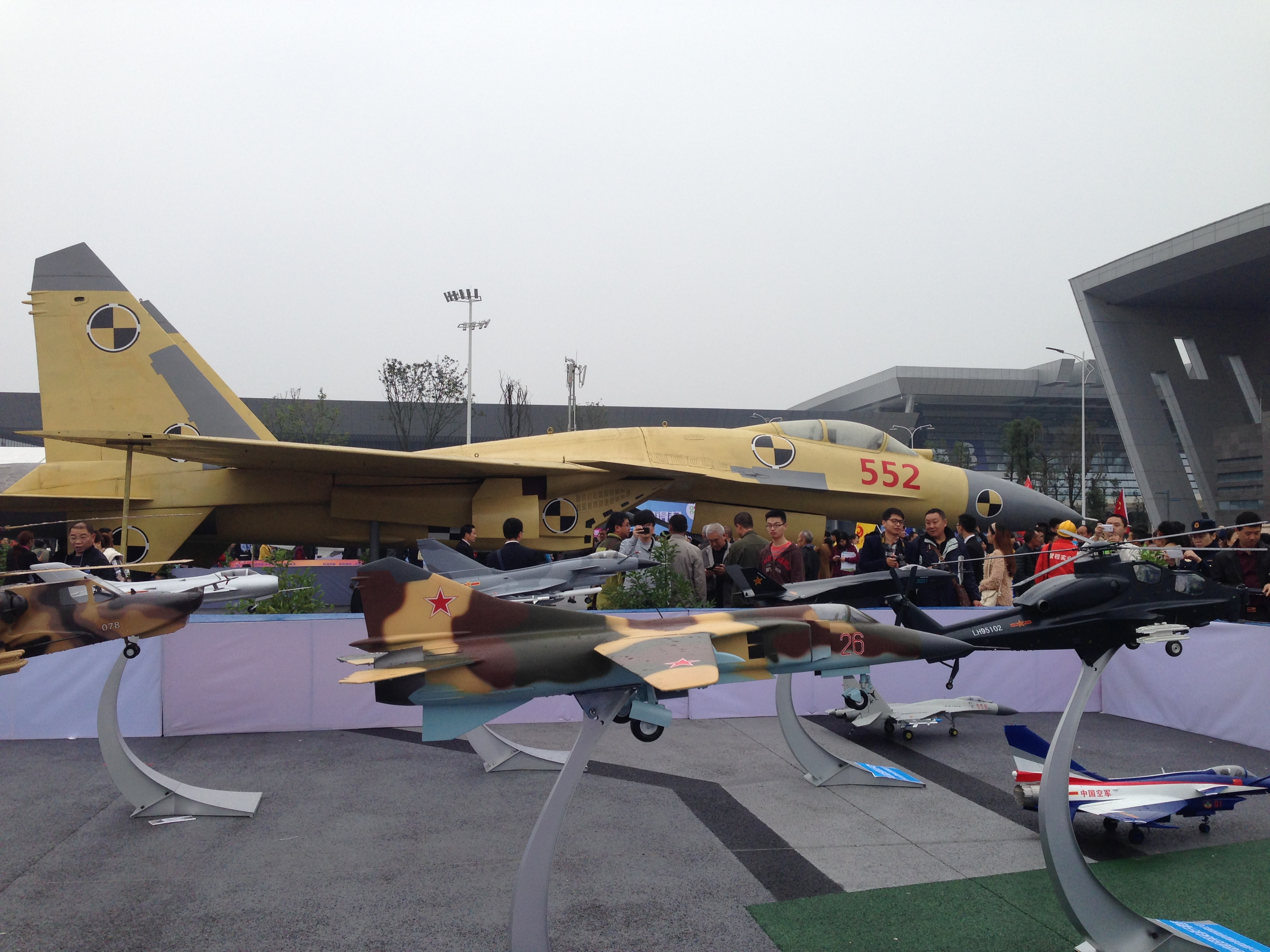
Shenyang J-15 testing prototype on public display in 2014

The J-15 took its maiden flight in August 2009.

On 7 May 2010, the J-15 conducted its first takeoff from a simulated ski-jump at the Chinese naval aviation test ground.

On 3 November 2012, the J-15S twin-seat variant conudcted its maiden flight.

On 21 October 2012, a test pilot performed the J-15's first arresting landing on the Liaoning. On 20 November 2012, a PLA Navy pilot successfully landed on the Liaoning. On 23 November 2012, two more Navy pilots landed the aircraft on Liaoning.

On 25 November 2012, Chinese media publicly reported that J-15s had made arrested landings on Liaoning. The first landing was made by pilot Dai Mingmeng (戴明盟). Luo Yang, the aircraft's head of production and designer, died the same day. PLA Daily newspaper indicated that the first five naval pilots (including Dai) conducted J-15 fighter landings and takeoffs. Test and training program officials confirmed that the carrier-borne aircraft and special equipment for the landing flight had gone through strict tests, and fighter jets can be deployed on the carrier.

In July 2016, a prototype with a nose landing gear for catapult launch, called J-15T, made its maiden flight. This prototype was powered by two indigenous Shenyang WS-10H engines. The type began test flight at PLAN land-based catapult facilities. In November 2016, the prototype was tested with both an electromagnetic catapult and a steam catapult at the PLA Navy catapult-test site.

In October 2016, a prototype of J-15D, a twin-seat electronic warfare (EW) variant, took maiden flight. Additional flight testings were recorded in May 2018, with various EW equipment and pods noted by analysts. In December 2018, the J-15D began operational testing.

=== Production and deployment ===
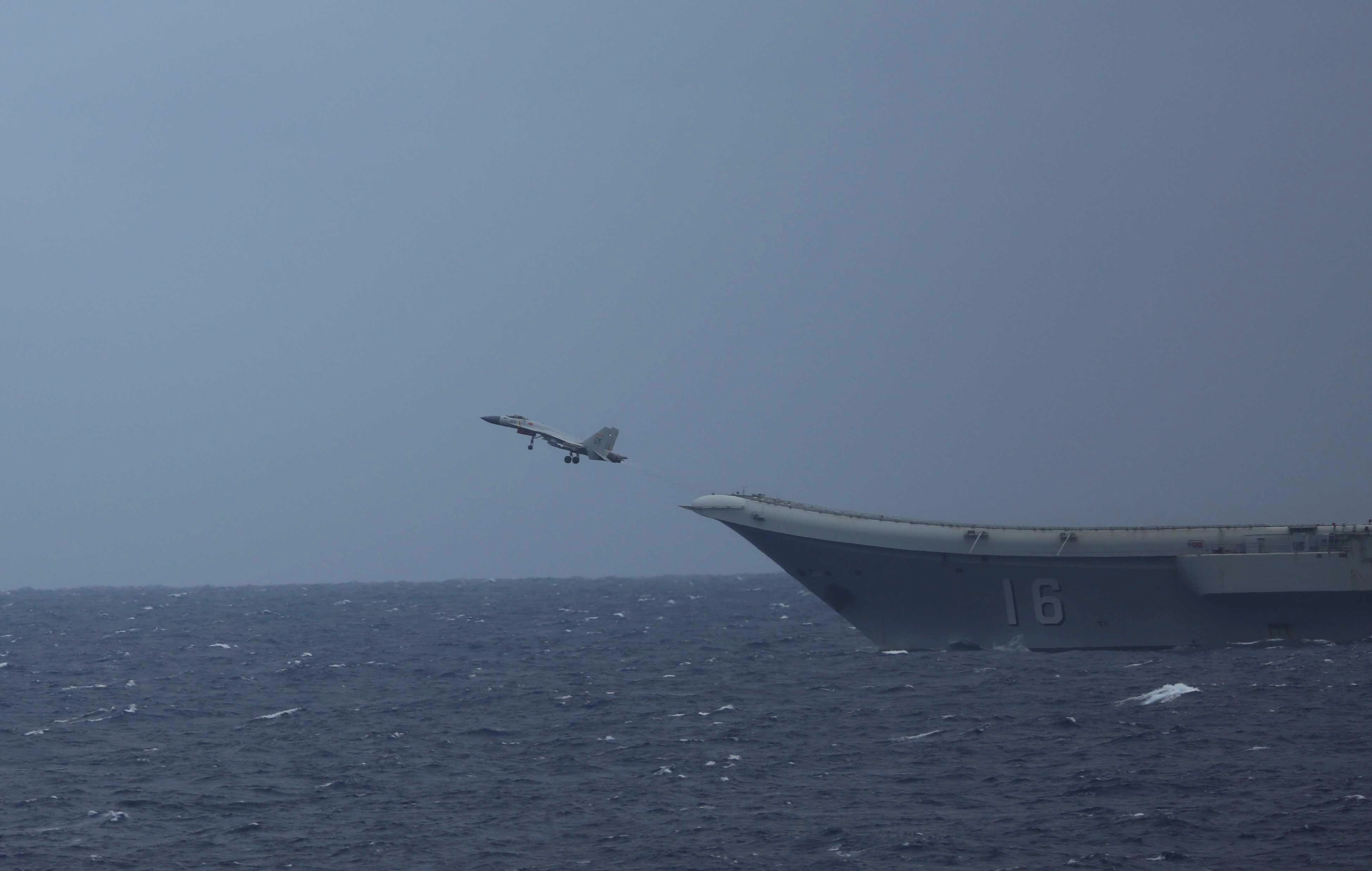
A J-15 taking off from the Liaoning

A total of 24 Shenyang J-15s were delivered to the People's Liberation Army Navy Air Force (PLANAF) in 2013. In 2014, the J-15s were deployed with the aircraft carrier Liaoning on tours.

In December 2013, Chinese media reported that J-15s are fully operational with combat markings and the mass production of the J-15 had begun.

In January 2017, Liaoning conducted take-off and landing drills with its J-15s in the South China Sea after its first deployment into the Western Pacific.

In February 2021, the J-15T variant entered production.

In July 2022, the J-15S entered limited service.

In October 2024, Chinese state media reported the J-15T and J-15D flying with Liaoning and Shandong in the South China Sea, suggesting the aircraft had entered service. Both aircraft were officially revealed at the China International Aviation & Aerospace Exhibition in November 2024.

On 1 August 2025, Chinese media released a video teasing the launch of the Shenyang J-15T variant on the Type 003 Fujian aircraft carrier with electromagnetic catapults. Though no complete sequence of the take-off and recovery was shown, analysts believed the carrier and its air wing were reaching an important milestone.

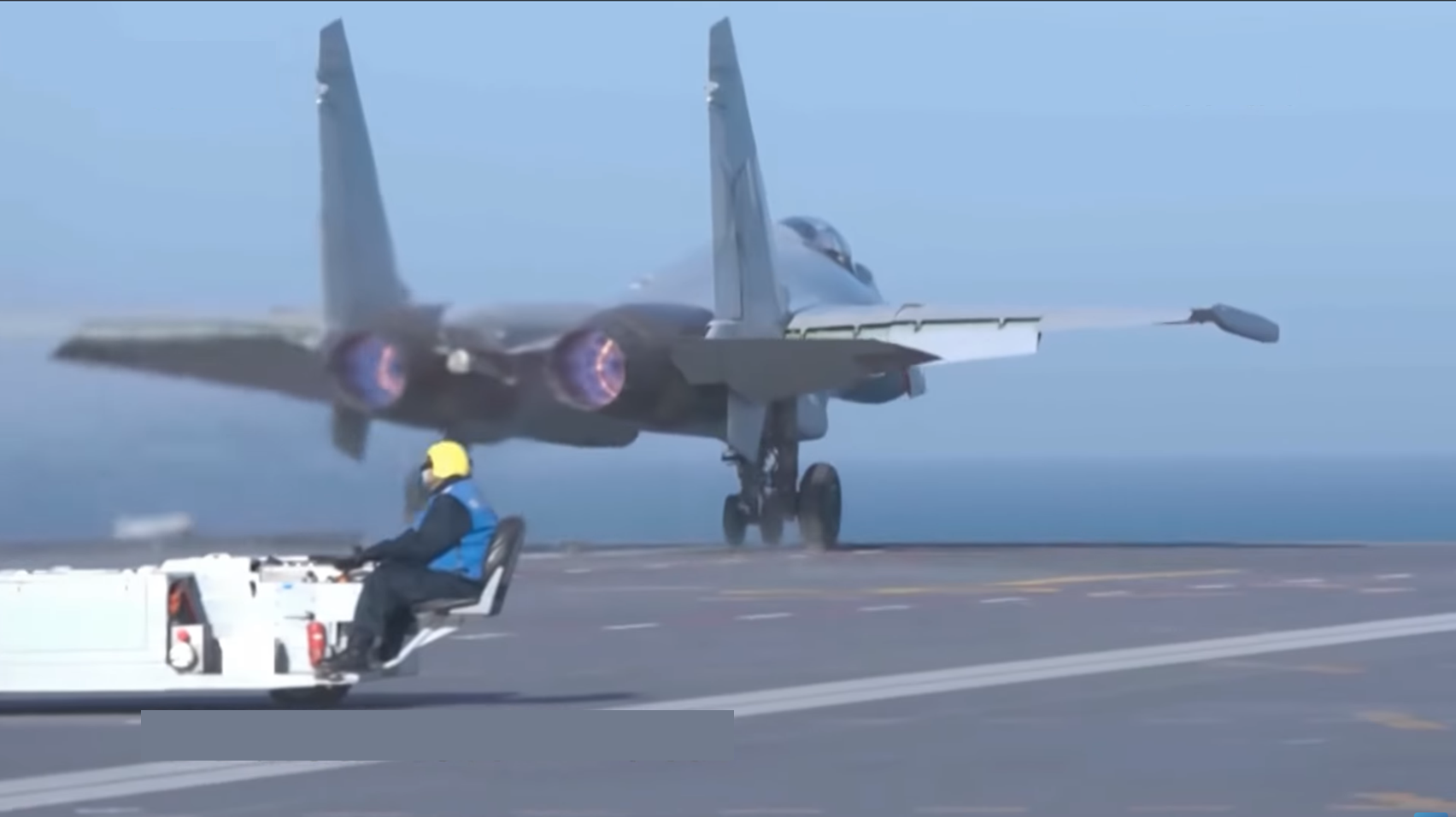
A J-15T being launched via electromagnetic catapults onboard the Fujian

On 22 September 2025, the Chinese state broadcaster released multiple videos and photos showing the complete catapult launch and recovery (CATOBAR) sequence for the Shenyang J-15T, along with Shenyang J-35 and Xi'an KJ-600 aircraft on the Type 003 Fujian aircraft carrier, via the ship's electromagnetic catapults. PLA Navy also announced that, with three aircraft being certified for CATOBAR flight operations, Fujian had achieved "initial full-deck operational capability", and the test would lay the foundation for the subsequent integration of the carrier aviation wing and the carrier strike group. These test flights were likely conducted months earlier, instead of in September.

In early July 2026, images were released showing a PLA Navy Shenyang J-15T operating off the Fujian carrier while armed with four YJ-83K air launched anti-ship cruise missiles. Military analysts noted that this doubling of take off ordnance payload would allow PLAN commanders to devote fewer fighter jets to anti-surface missions while retaining more for air superiority tasks around carrier battle groups, simultaneously also lowering flight deck congestion and improving overall offensive sortie efficiency. Alternatively, the extra take off weight allowed by the ship's CATOBAR system could be used for additional fuel drop tanks and allow the J-15T to engage in longer combat air patrols over greater distances from the carrier group.

== Accidents ==
- In April 2016, a J-15 crashed into the ocean after experiencing a flight control system failure. The pilot, Cao Xianjian, ejected shortly before impact, below the altitude needed for the parachute to function; he was severely injured upon landing.
- On 27 April 2016, a J-15 crashed during a simulated landing when a flight control system malfunction caused the aircraft to pitch up to 80 degrees. The pilot, Zhang Chao, ejected below the altitude needed for the parachute to function; he eventually died from injuries sustained upon landing, and was posthumously awarded the First Class Order of Heroic Exemplar on 30 November.
- In July 2017, a J-15 suffered a left engine fire after ingesting a bird shortly after takeoff. The pilot, Yuan Wei, with the aid of instructions from air traffic controllers, performed an emergency landing and ground crews extinguished the fire.
- On 15 March 2025, a J-15 crashed near Jialai Town in the Hainan Province of China. The aircraft's nose down, tail up position, along with it flying with gear down at slow speeds indicates that the aircraft was trying to land when the incident happened, however the cause is still being investigated. Reports say that the pilot successfully ejected from the aircraft and no one was harmed in the incident.

== Variants ==
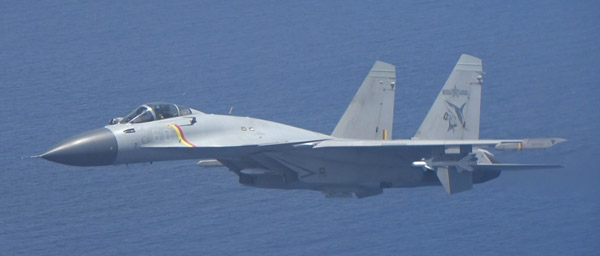
A J-15 from Shandong

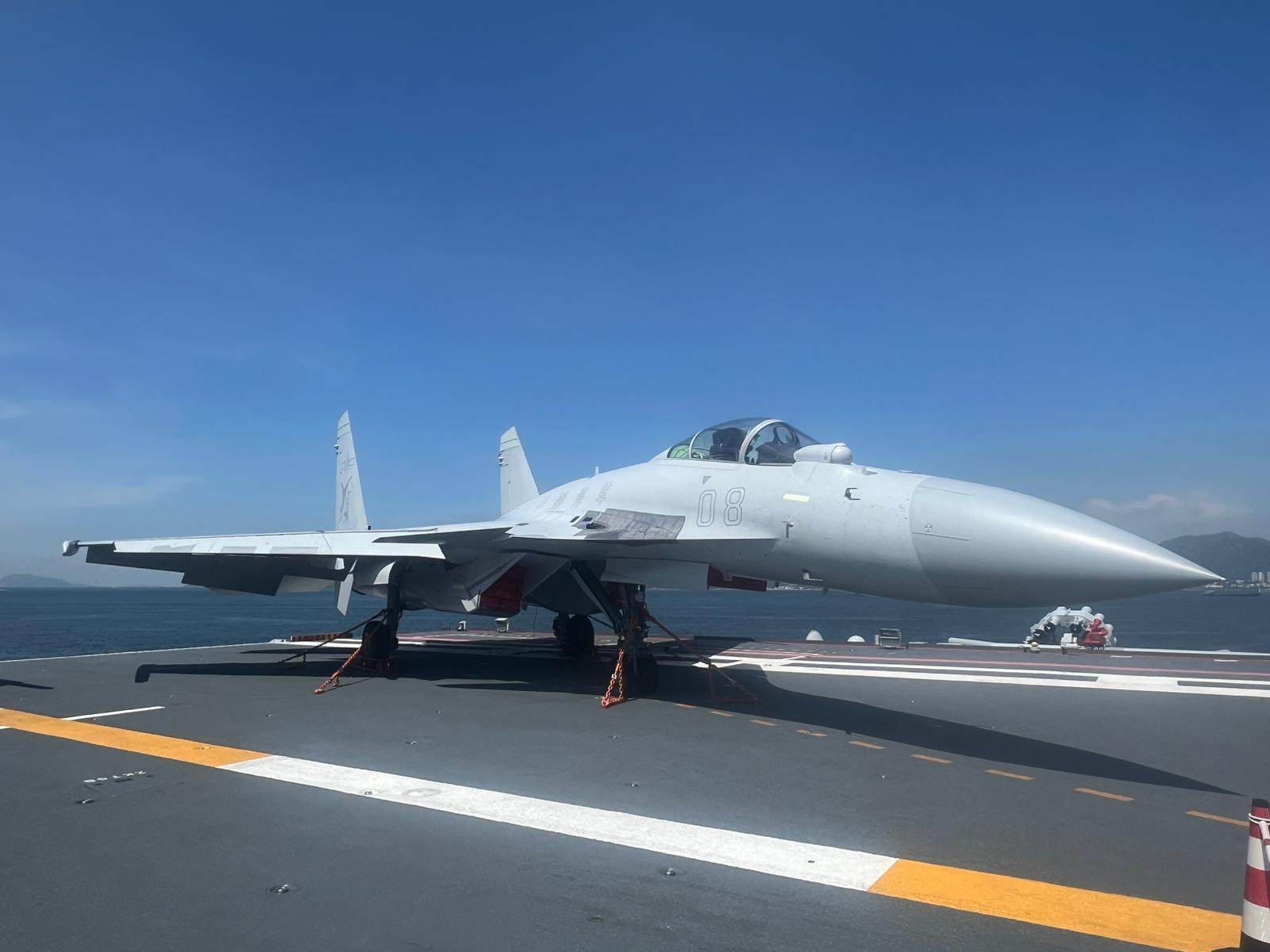
Shenyang J-15T displayed on the aircraft carrier Shandong (CV-17) visiting Hong Kong

- J-15 (NATO reporting name Flanker-X2): Single-seat variant.
- J-15S: Two-seat variant, first flown in 2012. Entered service in July 2022. Possible usage as trainer, multirole strike fighter, or testbed for the twin-seat J-15D electronic warfare aircraft.
- J-15T: Improved variant of J-15 incorporating CATOBAR launch capability, WS-10 engines, modern fifth-generation avionics, AESA radar, new airframes, stealth coatings, and compatibility to launch PL-10 and PL-15 missiles. First seen in September 2016, with two prototypes built. In active service as of October 2024. Previously referred to as J-15B in media.
- J-15DH: Two-seat electronic warfare variant with EW pods and other electronic equipment installed and IRST sensor removed. Began operational testing in December 2018, and entered service by October 2024. Suitable for STOBAR operations. It was named J-15D by analysts before its official name reveal in September 2025.
- J-15DT: Improved J-15D EW aircraft with electronic warfare support and strike capability, incorporating CATOBAR launch modifications, changes in radome shape, and modified fuselage antennas. First observed in August 2025.

== Operators ==
China

- People's Liberation Army Naval Air Force - 60 J-15, 50+ J-15T and 6 J-15D units in service as of 2026.
  - Chinese aircraft carrier Liaoning
  - Chinese aircraft carrier Shandong
  - Chinese aircraft carrier Fujian
  - Lingshui Air Base
    External videos
    - J-15 pilots receiving training(1:59-12:18)
    - https://www.youtube.com/watch?v=hKwt2v28pPU

== Specifications (estimated) ==
Data from Jianyue (Tianjin) Information Technology, CCTV (Sun Cong interview transcript)

General characteristics

- Crew: 1 or 2
- Length: 22.28 m (73 ft 1 in)
- Wingspan: 14.70 m (48 ft 3 in) or 7.4 m (24 ft 3 in) with wings folded
- Height: 5.92 m (19 ft 5 in)
- Wing area: 67.84 m^{2} (730.2 sq ft)
- Empty weight: 17,500 kg (38,581 lb)
- Gross weight: 27,000 kg (59,525 lb)
- Max takeoff weight: 33,000 kg (72,753 lb)
- Fuel capacity: 9,800 kg (21,600 lb) internal
- Powerplant: 2 × Saturn AL-31 or WS-10B afterburning turbofans, 122.6–135 kN (27,600–30,300 lbf) with afterburner

Performance

- Maximum speed: 2,300 km/h (1,400 mph, 1,200 kn)
- Maximum speed: Mach 2.17
- Range: 3,500 km (2,200 mi, 1,900 nmi)
- Combat range: 1,270 km (790 mi, 690 nmi)
- Service ceiling: 18,000 m (59,000 ft)
- g limits: +8 g
- Rate of climb: 246 m/s (48,400 ft/min)
- Thrust/weight: 0.93 with AL-31 (1.01-1.07 with WS-10B)

Armament

- 1 × 30 mm GSh-30-1 cannon with 150 rounds
- Munitions on twelve external hardpoints with a capacity of 6,500 kg, including:
  - PL-15 long-range air-to-air missile (J-15T and J-15D)
  - PL-12 medium-range air-to-air missile
  - PL-10 short-range air-to-air missile
  - PL-8 short-range air-to-air missile
  - YJ-83K anti-ship cruise missile
  - YJ-15 anti-ship cruise missile
  - KD-88 standoff land attack missile
  - AKF-98 standoff land attack missile
  - YJ-91 anti-radiation missile
  - Various bombs and rockets
  - UPAZ-1A buddy refueling pod

Avionics

- Type 1493 radar for Shenyang J-15
  - J-15D and J-15T have unspecificed active electronically scanned array (AESA) radar
- MIL-STD-1553B bi-directional data bus
- Glass cockpit
- LCD screen
- 4-redundant 3-axis fly by wire

== See also ==
- Fourth-generation jet fighter

Related development

- Shenyang J-11B
- Shenyang J-16
- Sukhoi Su-33

Aircraft of comparable role, configuration, and era

- Boeing F/A-18E/F Super Hornet
- Boeing EA-18G Growler
- Mikoyan MiG-29K
- Rafale M
