= Type 004 aircraft carrier =

Chinese aircraft carrier in development

Class overview
- Builders: Dalian Shipyard, Jiangnan Shipyard
- Operators: People's Liberation Army Navy
- Preceded by: Type 003 Fujian
- Planned: 6
- Building: 1

General characteristics
- Class & type: Type 004
- Type: Aircraft carrier
- Displacement: Up to 120,000 tons
- Length: 336 m to 339 m (estimated)
- Installed power: Two nuclear reactors (estimated)
- Propulsion: Nuclear marine propulsion
- Speed: At least 30 kn (56 km/h; 35 mph)
- Aircraft carried: 90 to 100 helicopters and fixed wing aircraft, including J-15T multirole fighters, J-35 stealth fighters, KJ-600 AEW&C aircraft, HZ-20 ASW/utility helicopters, and stealth attack drones.
- Aviation facilities: 4–5 EM catapults, hangar deck

The Type 004 aircraft carrier is an upcoming class of supercarriers for the Chinese People's Liberation Army Navy. The yet-unnamed lead ship of the class has been under construction at the Dalian Shipyard since 2024,. It is the fourth aircraft carrier of the Chinese aircraft carrier programme and the third to be built from the keel up by China itself. (Note: China's first carrier, the Liaoning, completed a Soviet hulk, purchased from Ukraine.)

Like the proceeding Type 003 carrier Fujian, the Type 004 carriers will be capable of catapult-assisted takeoff but arrested recovery (CATOBAR) operations via the same DC-supercapacitor electromagnetic catapult system jointly developed by the China Shipbuilding Industry Corporation and the Chinese Academy of Engineering. Unlike the conventionally-powered Fujian, the Type 004 will be much larger and also likely to be the first Chinese surface warship to feature nuclear marine propulsion.

China hoped to complete the carrier by the late 2020s. The US Defense Department stated in their December 2025 China Military Power Report that the PLAN aimed to build six new carriers by 2035, although it did not specify whether these would be Type 004 carriers.

== Design ==
=== Size ===
According to analysts, the Type 004 carrier may have a displacement of 110,000–120,000 tons, making it 10–20% more massive than the USS Gerald R. Ford. This would make the Type 004 aircraft carrier the world's largest aircraft carrier once it has been completed.

=== Nuclear propulsion ===
In 2017, the Chinese Central Government was reportedly ready to spend RMB 22 billion (USD$3.3 billion) on the development of two prototype TMSR-LF1 thorium-based molten-salt reactors to be built at Wuwei, Gansu province in northwestern China, aiming to have the reactors operational by 2020.

In December 2023, Jiangnan Shipyard unveiled plans for KUN-24AP, a 24,000 TEU nuclear-powered container ship designed to use Gen IV molten-salt reactors for propulsion. The PLA Navy is interested in the same technology to power large surface warships as part of China's military-civil fusion strategy.

=== Aviation ===
The Type 004 could carry a larger complement of fixed-wing and rotorwing carrier-based aircraft than previous Chinese aircraft carriers, including the catapult-ready J-15T, J-15D and J-35 fighters, Xian KJ-600 AEW&C aircraft, HZ-20 utility/ASW helicopters and stealth attack drones such as the GJ-21.

It was previously suggested that the aircraft carrier might carry J-20 stealth-fighter aircraft. However, in a programme in 2017 on China Central Television, retired PLAN Rear Admiral Zhang Zhaozhong dismissed the possibility that the J-20 aircraft would be used on aircraft carriers as the aircraft was not structurally designed to cope with carrier operations. In addition, the plane does not have folding wings for compact storage, and its stealth coating would be susceptible to degradation while at sea.

== History ==
=== Construction ===
In November 2024, reports were published that China was in the process of building a land-based prototype nuclear reactor for a large surface warship. According to Associated Press, and based on new analysis of satellite imagery and Chinese government documents, this was a clear sign that China was starting to produce its first nuclear-powered aircraft carrier. The Middlebury Institute of International Studies in California was reported to have said that a mountain site outside the city of Leshan in the southwest Chinese province of Sichuan was the place where the prototype reactor was being developed.

On 13 February 2025, reports and images surfaced that showed construction work on a module consistent with an aircraft carrier being carried out at a shipyard in Dalian, in Liaoning province. The module apparently was a section of the flight deck and was seen in satellite imagery provided by Google Earth in May 2024. In early 2024, analysts observed, sections of the C3 and C4 catapults were also being built for testing near the dock in Dalian where the second Chinese aircraft carrier Shandong was built from 2013 to 2016.

According to the South China Morning Post, commercial satellite photographs posted on Chinese social media at the end of September 2025 very probably showed new hull sections of the Type 004 aircraft carrier being built at the shipyard in Dalian, Liaoning. The sections were not visible in satellite imagery from August 2025, making a start to the hull of the aircraft carrier in September 2025 convincing. According to analysts, the Type 004 carrier would likely have a displacement of 110,000–120,000 tons, making it 10–20% more massive than the USS Gerald R. Ford, which is currently the US's biggest aircraft carrier. This would make the Type 004 aircraft carrier China's first nuclear-powered supercarrier, as well as the world's largest aircraft carrier once it has been completed.

The Type 004 carrier is also expected to have 4–5 EMALS, and have the capacity to support at least 90–100 aircraft. Satellite imagery indicates that construction likely began in 2024, with progress becoming evident by late 2025. Based on the specifications of the Type 004 and China's building plans, military analysts believe that China is planning to rival the capabilities of the US's Ford supercarrier, and match the firepower of the US carrier fleet in the Pacific, while also giving China the ability to project power beyond the Second Island Chain.

Originally, China was planning to build around four Type 004 aircraft carriers, which would give them a total fleet size of seven carriers. However, in December 2025, the US Defense Department revealed that China had revised their plan upwards, planning to produce six Type 004 carriers by 2035, which would give them a total of nine aircraft carriers. This would outnumber the six aircraft carriers currently deployed by the US Pacific Fleet.

Satellite imagery from May 2026 revealed that further progress had been made on the construction of the hull since January 2026: work on the bow and stern of the carrier were now clearly visible on photographs. Internal layouts visible on satellite images also suggested the presence of twin containment spaces consistent with a double nuclear reactor configuration. On 21 August 2026, satellite imagery showed the hull of Type 004 making further progress, with the bow visibly more complete than in May 2026.

== See also ==
- Chinese aircraft carrier programme
