= CATOBAR =

Carrier centric aircraft launch-recovery system

Flight deck of USS Dwight D. Eisenhower, showing catapult layout

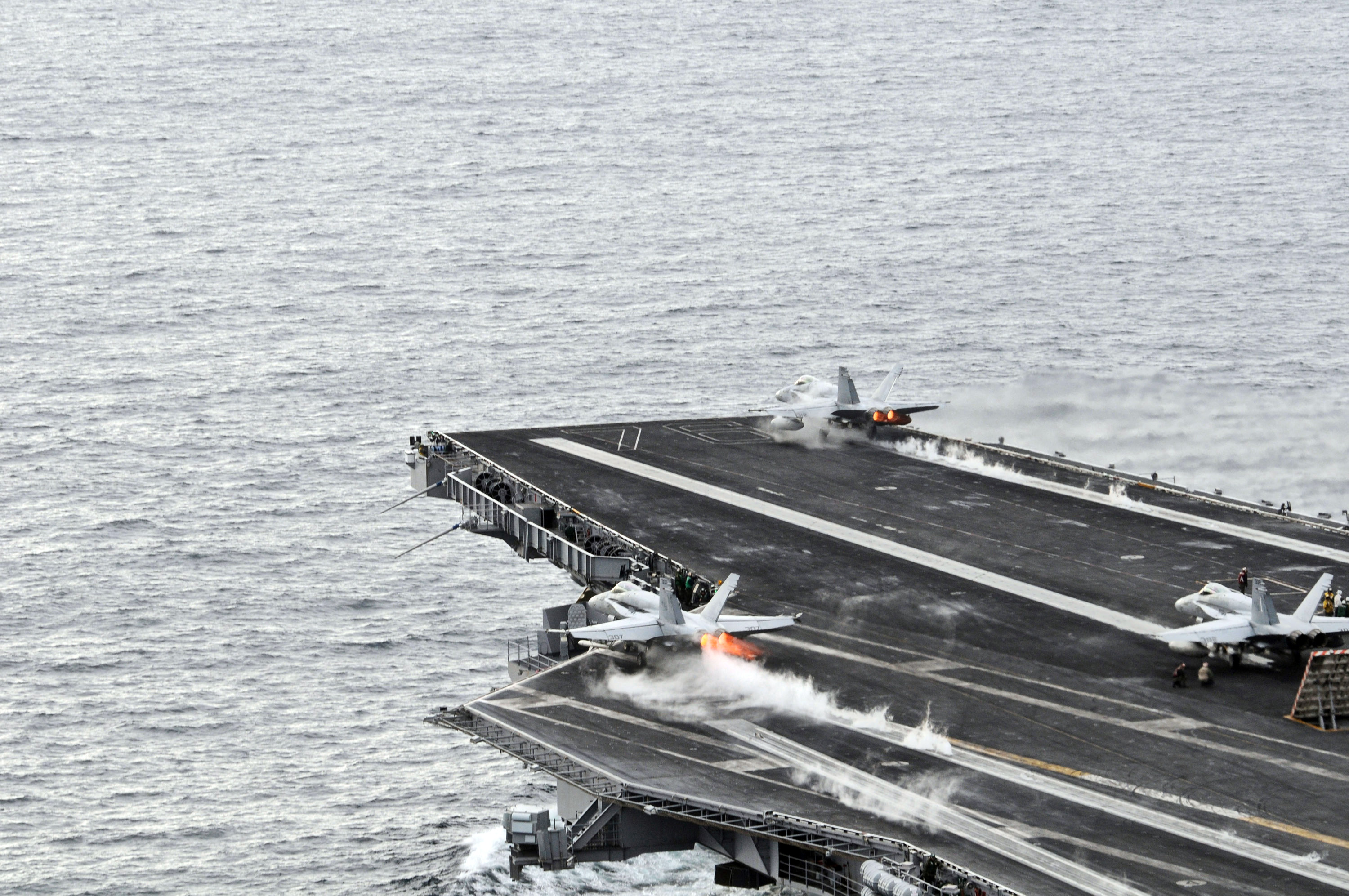
Catapult launches aboard USS Ronald Reagan

CATOBAR (acronym for catapult-assisted take-off but arrested recovery or catapult-assisted take-off, barrier arrested recovery) is a naval aviation system used for the takeoff and landing of fixed-wing aircraft from the flight deck of an aircraft carrier. Under the CATOBAR system, carrier-based aircraft are launched via assisted take-off with additional acceleration from an aircraft catapult, and land on the ship (the recovery phase) with assisted deceleration from an arresting gear.

Although the CATOBAR system is costlier and more technologically complex than alternative launch and recovery methods, it provides greater flexibility in carrier operations, since it imposes less onerous design requirements on fixed-wing aircraft than alternative methods such as STOVL or STOBAR, allowing for a greater maximum takeoff weight and thus more payload for ordnance and/or fuel. CATOBAR systems enable jet aircraft (which are much heavier than the propeller-powered naval fighters used during the Second World War) to be launched from only half of the carrier's deck length (leaving the aft-half as an angled flight deck dedicated to landing), and can launch heavy propeller aircraft that lack a high thrust-to-weight ratio such as the Grumman E-2 Hawkeye and C-2 Greyhound.

== Types ==
The catapult system in use in most CATOBAR carriers is the steam catapult. Its primary advantage is the amount of power and control it can provide. During World War II, the US Navy used a hydraulic catapult.

The United States and China have developed electromagnetic catapults that use a linear motor drive instead of steam. The electromagnetic catapult is found on the American Gerald R. Ford-class carriers (the electromagnetic aircraft launch system), the Chinese carrier Fujian and Type 076 class amphibious assault ships.

== Current users ==
Since Brazil decommissioned NAe São Paulo in February 2017, only three states operate carriers that use the CATOBAR system: the U.S. with its Nimitz-class and Gerald R. Ford-class, France with its Charles De Gaulle, and China with its Type-003 Fujian.

=== Active CATOBAR aircraft carrier classes ===
Class	Picture	Origin	No. of ships	Propulsion	Displacement	Operator	Aircraft carried	Catapult
Nimitz		United States	10	Nuclear	100,020 t (220,510,000 lb)	United States Navy	F/A-18C Hornet; F/A-18E/F Super Hornet; F-35C Lightning II; EA-18G Growler; C-2 Greyhound; E-2C/D Hawkeye	C-13-1 or C-13-2 steam
Gerald R. Ford		United States	1	Nuclear	100,000 t (220,000,000 lb)	United States Navy	F/A-18E/F Super Hornet; F-35C Lightning II; EA-18G Growler; E-2D Hawkeye	EMALS
Charles de Gaulle		France	1	Nuclear	42,500 t (93,700,000 lb)	French Navy	Rafale M E-2C Hawkeye	C-13-3 steam
Fujian/Type 003		China	1	Conventional	80,000+ t	People's Liberation Army Navy	Shenyang J-15; Shenyang J-35; Xi'an KJ-600; Harbin Z-20	EM catapult

=== CATOBAR carriers under construction ===
Class	Picture	Origin	No. of ships	Propulsion	Displacement	Operator	Aircraft carried	Catapult
Gerald R. Ford		United States	3	Nuclear	100,000 t	United States Navy	F/A-18E/F Super Hornet; F-35C Lightning II; EA-18G Growler; E-2D Hawkeye	EMALS
Type 076		China	1	Conventional	48,000 t	People's Liberation Army Navy	Hongdu GJ-11	EM catapult
PANG		France	1	Nuclear	75,000 t	French Navy	Dassault Rafale M or FCAS	EMALS
Type 004		China	1	Nuclear	110,000 t	People's Liberation Army Navy	Shenyang J-15 or Shenyang J-35; Xi'an KJ-600	EM catapult

=== CATOBAR carriers planned ===
Class	Picture	Origin	No. of ships	Propulsion	Displacement	Operator	Aircraft carried	Catapult
Gerald R. Ford		United States	2	Nuclear	100,000 t	United States Navy	F/A-18E/F Super Hornet; F-35C Lightning II; EA-18G Growler; E-2D Hawkeye	EMALS
INS Vishal		India	1	Integrated electric propulsion	65,000+ t	Indian Navy	HAL TEDBF Dassault Rafale M HAL Tejas Naval Variant (Planned)	EM Catapult

== List of CATOBAR aircraft ==
- F/A-18E/F – only operated by the US Navy.
- EA-18G – only operated by the US Navy.
- C-2A – only operated by the US Navy.
- F/A-18C/D – only active with the US Marine Corps.
- Rafale M – only operated by the French Navy.
- E-2C/D – only active with the US Navy and the French Navy.
- F-35C – only operated by the US Navy and Marine Corps.
- Shenyang J-35 - only operated by the PLAN.
- J-15T - only operated by the PLAN.
- KJ-600 - only operated by PLAN.

== Potential users ==
The Chinese Fujian (Type 003) has an integrated electric propulsion system that will allow the operation of electromagnetic catapults, similar to the Electromagnetic Aircraft Launch System (EMALS) used by the United States Navy.

INS Vishal, India's second indigenous aircraft carrier of the Vikrant-class, is planned to displace 65,000 tons and to use the EMALS catapults developed by General Atomics, as it supports heavier fighters, AEW aircraft, and UCAVs that cannot launch using STOBAR ski jump ramps.

Under Project Ark Royal, the Royal Navy plans to install catapults and arrestor equipment on its two STOVL-configured Queen Elizabeth-class aircraft carriers to launch and recover combat drones that are being procured under Project Vixen.

The Turkish defence industry is developing an indigenous catapult system to replace the ski jumps on its MUGEM-class aircraft carrier.

== See also ==
- List of all aircraft carriers
