= Assisted take-off =

System used to help aircraft get into the air

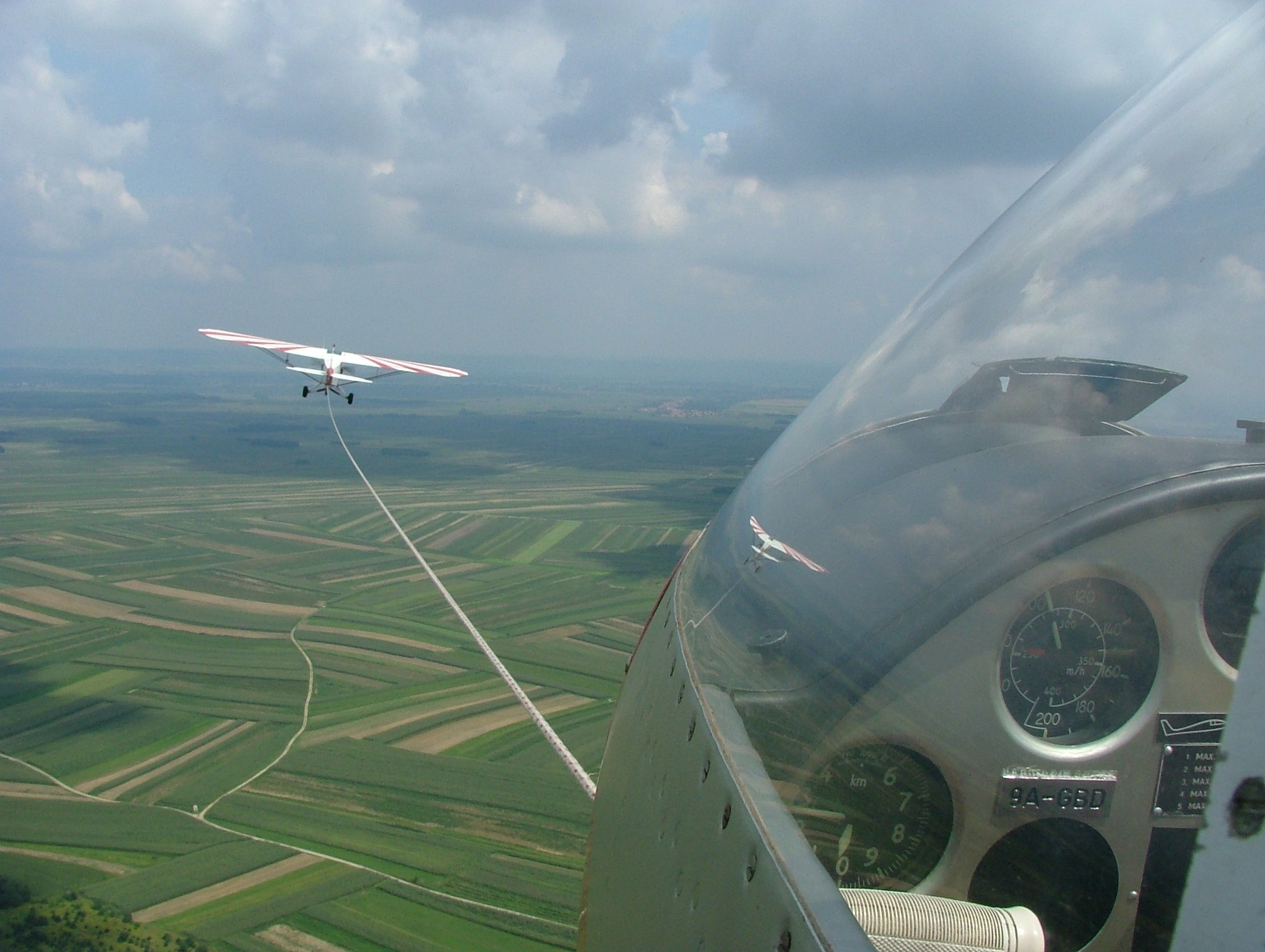
Tow line and towing aircraft seen from the cockpit of a glider

In aviation, assisted takeoff is any external system for helping aircraft (more specifically fixed-wing aircraft) to become airborne (take off) for flight, as opposed to doing so conventionally using strictly their own propulsion. The reasons assistance might be needed include: the combined weight of the aircraft and its payloads exceeding the maximum takeoff weight; insufficient engine power by design or malfunction, insufficient available runway length (such as on the flight deck of an aviation warship), or a combination of the above. Assisted takeoff is also required for gliders, which do not have any engine and thus are unable to propel themselves for takeoffs.

== Catapult-assisted ==
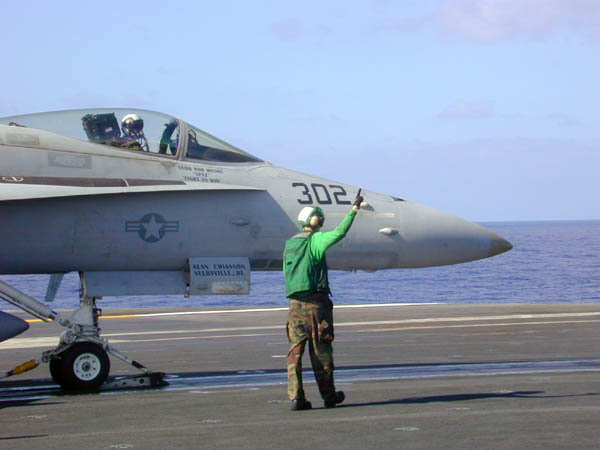
F/A-18 attached to steam catapult preparatory to launch

The most well-known type of assisted takeoff is via an aircraft catapult, which is used on modern aircraft carriers to launch fixed-wing carrier-based aircraft from the short runway distances available on the flight deck. The catapult is built into the flight deck as a slot track, with a sliding piece known as a shuttle, which protrudes above the deck. The aircraft is attached to the shuttle using a tow bar or launch bar mounted to the nose landing gear (an older system used a steel cable called a catapult bridle; the forward ramps on older carrier bows were used to catch these cables), and is flung off the deck at about 15 knots above minimum flying speed, achieved by the catapult in a four-second run.

The current mainstay catapult system is steam catapult, first invented by the British in the 1950s. It is essentially a single-action steam engine, in which the shuttle is attached to a piston and propelled down the track under the high pressure of the superheated steam within the cylinder under the catapult track. The steam can be generated by superheater boilers or, in the case of nuclear-powered supercarriers, by heating from nuclear reactors. The United States Navy and French Navy are the only current users of steam catapults, with the latter using the same C-13-3 catapult imported from the United States.

Into the 21st century, the United States have planned to replace steam catapults with an electromagnetic catapult system based on the working principles of linear induction motor, which instead of pneumatics uses Laplace force generated by the track armatures to propel the catapult shuttle, allowing shorter launch intervals, more variable, precise control over the launch power, less impulsive wear on the aircraft's airframe, and reduced maintenance against rusting and leakages. The new EM catapult system, called the Electromagnetic Aircraft Launch System (EMALS), was developed by General Atomics based on an AC motor-flywheel construct and is currently installed on the lead ship of the Ford-class aircraft carriers, the USS Gerald R. Ford (CVN-78). A separate EM system based on a DC motor-supercapacitor construct has also been developed in China jointly by the China Shipbuilding Industry Corporation and the Chinese Academy of Engineering, and is currently installed on the newly commissioned People's Liberation Army Navy aircraft carrier Fujian (18), as well as the currently fitting-out Type 076 amphibious assault ship Sichuan (51) and the upcoming Type 004 aircraft carriers.

== Jet/rocket-assisted ==
In jet-assisted takeoff (JATO) and the similar rocket-assisted takeoff (RATO) systems, additional engines are mounted on the airframe which are used only during takeoff. After that these attached engines are usually jettisoned, or else they just become parasitic deadweight that add drag to the aircraft. However, some aircraft such as the Avro Shackleton MR.3 Phase 2, had permanently attached JATO engines. The four J-47 turbojet engines on the B-36 were not considered JATO systems; they were an integral part of the aircraft's propulsion, and were used during takeoff, climb, and cruise at altitude. The Hercules LC-130 can be equipped with a JATO rocket system to shorten takeoff as used in the LC-130 Skibird for polar missions.

During WW2 the German Arado Ar 234 and the Messerschmitt Me 323 "Gigant" used rocket units beneath the wings for assisted takeoff. Such systems were popular during the 1950s, when heavy bombers started to require two or more miles of runway to take off fully laden. This was exacerbated by the relatively low power available from jet engines at the time—for example the Boeing B-52 Stratofortress required eight turbojet engines to yield the required performance, and still needed RATO for very heavy payloads (a proposed update of the B-52 replaces these with half the number of much more powerful engines). In a Cold War context, RATO and JATO bottles were seen as a way for fighter aircraft to use the undamaged sections of runways of airfields which had been attacked.

== Gliders ==
Glider aircraft which do not have an engine also require an assisted takeoff. Apart from self launching gliders, EASA recognizes four other launch methods: winch launches, aerotows, bungee launches and car tows.

== Gravity assistance ==
Early pioneers in powered and unpowered flight used gravity to accelerate their aircraft to a speed which allowed its wings to generate enough lift to achieve independent flight. These included attempts to achieve flight from towers, city walls and cliffs. Generally more successful were attempts in which speed was built up by accelerating down hills and mountain slopes, sometimes on rails or ramps.

== Mother ship (carrier) aircraft ==
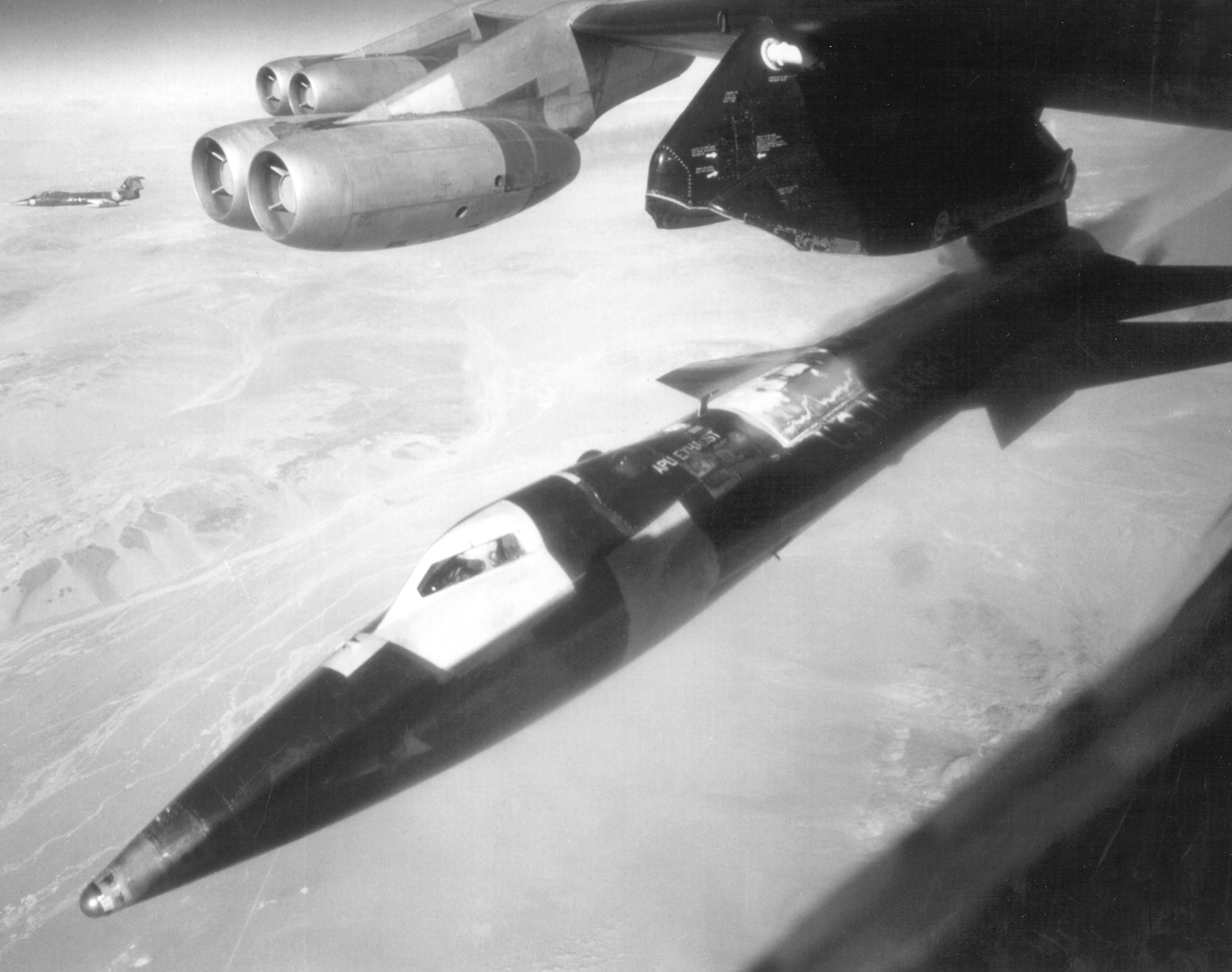
An X-15 pictured just after release from a B-52 carrier aircraft

Another form of gravity assistance is when an aircraft is released from a larger mother ship or mother craft. This may be because the daughter craft is incapable of taking off normally e.g. the atmospheric flight tests of the Space Shuttle.

Usually the rationale for such a system is to free the daughter craft from the need to climb to its release height under its own power. This allows the daughter craft to be designed with fewer weight and aerodynamic restrictions allowing for exotic configurations to be used or tested, for example the recent SpaceShipOne, and previously the Bell X-1 and other X-planes.

In the interwar years, to achieve long ranges with the technology of the time, trials were undertaken with floatplanes piggy-backed atop flying boats. With the floatplane carried part of the way to its destination and freed from having to use any of its own fuel in the initial climb, these combinations could deliver light but time-critical cargos faster and farther than a single individual aircraft (for example the Short Mayo Composite).

Hot air balloons have acted as "motherships" to hang gliders and para gliders in altitude and distance record attempts.

== See also ==
- Colditz Cock glider, for an example of gravity assistance.
- History of aviation, for the work of the early pioneers.
- Silbervogel, a long-range bomber proposal, using a rail-mounted captive rocket booster.
