= Luo Yang (aircraft designer) =

Chinese aircraft designer

- 罗阳
- Born: Luo Yang; 1961; Shenyang, Liaoning Province, People's Republic of China
- Died: November 25, 2012 (aged 51); Dalian, Liaoning Province, People's Republic of China
- Resting place: Huilonggang Cemetery for Revolutionaries, Shenyang
- Citizenship: Chinese
- Education: Beihang University
- Occupation: Aircraft designer
- Years active: 1982–2012
- Employer: Shenyang Aircraft Corporation

Luo Yang (1961 – November 25, 2012) was a Chinese aircraft designer. He was the head of production and designer for the Shenyang J-15 fighter jet. He was also the chairman and general manager of Shenyang Aircraft Corporation.

== Career ==
In 1982, after graduating from Beihang University with a bachelor's degree, where he studied high-altitude equipment, Luo Yang joined the Shenyang Aircraft Design Institute. After some time there, he was promoted to deputy director of the institute.

== Death ==
On November 25, 2012, Luo suffered a sudden heart attack and subsequently died in hospital. Luo was under pressure to make the J-15 fighter jet land on aircraft carrier Liaoning successfully. A memorial service for him was held in Shenyang, his birthplace.
