= Yin Zhuo =

Rear admiral in the People's Liberation Army Navy

Yin Zhuo (Chinese: 尹卓; born September 1945), is a rear admiral in the Chinese People's Liberation Army Navy, and a committee member of the eleventh Chinese People's Political Consultative Conference.

Yin Zhuo is Han Chinese and was born in September 1945 of father Yin Mingliang (尹明亮), a vice political commissar of the People's Liberation Army in Fuzhou, China. Yin Zhuo is a member of the Chinese Communist Party. Yin was educated at the Université de Paris and the French Naval Academy.

Yin Zhuo was the director of the consultative committee for the informatization of the Chinese Navy during the eleventh Chinese People's consultative conference.

Yin Zhuo is most notable for statements that China should establish an offshore base in order to curtail piracy in Somalia. In his capacity as researcher, Yin has accused the United States of sparking an arms race through its use of missile defence systems in the Asia-Pacific region, to the detriment of developing countries with limited budgets, issued warnings over the firing of live rounds as a warning during the Diaoyu Islands dispute, and contributed to the growing debate over the international use of the Arctic by reinforcing it as a universal common, over which sovereignty cannot be claimed.
