= Drone carrier =

Ship that transports and launches drones

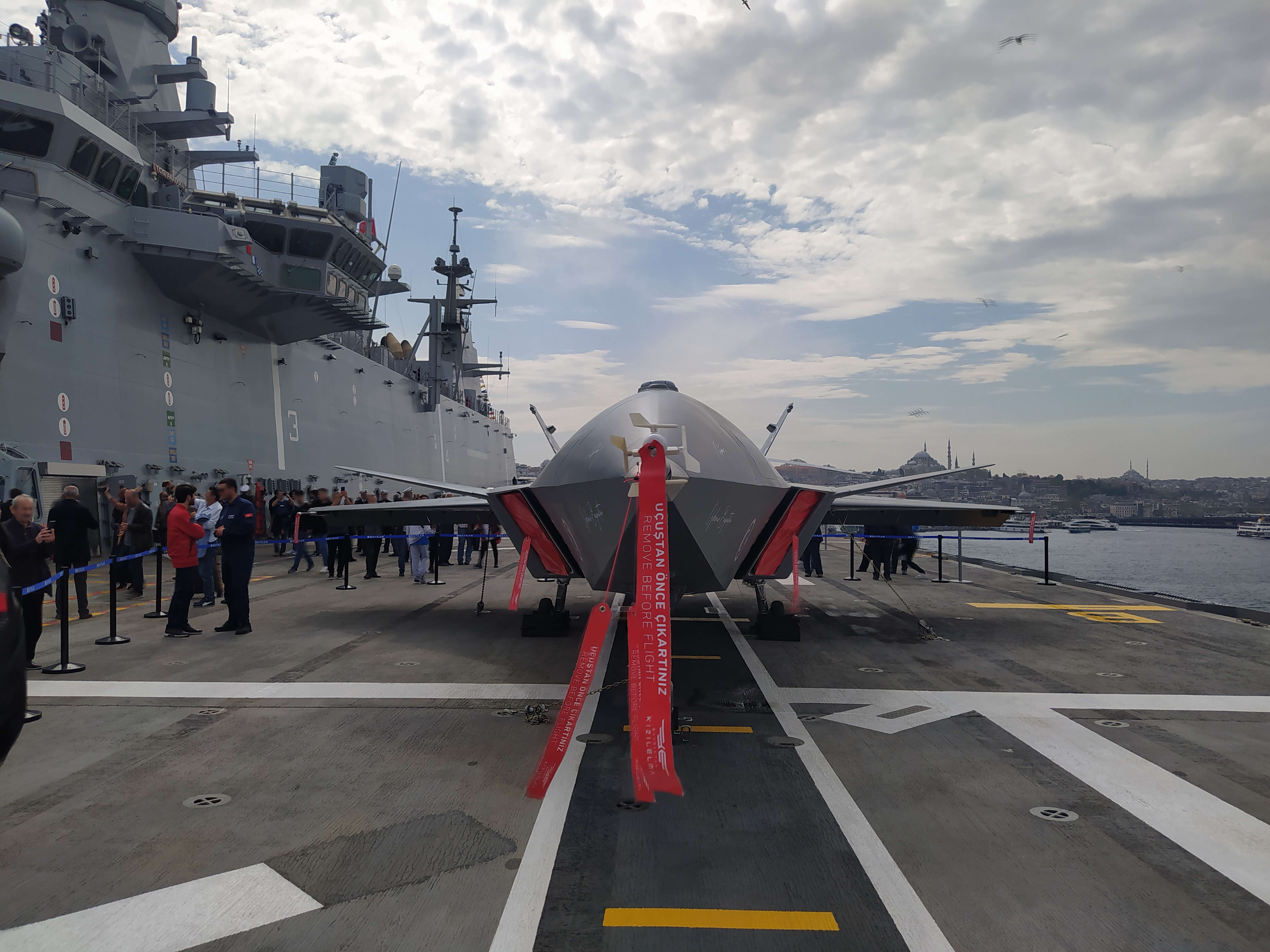
Bayraktar Kızılelma the world's first carrier-capable unmanned multirole fighter on the deck of world's first military drone carrier TCG Anadolu (L-400).

A drone carrier is a crewed or uncrewed ship equipped with a flight deck on which unmanned aerial vehicles (drones) can take off and land. In addition to unmanned aerial vehicles, a drone carrier can also launch unmanned underwater vehicles and unmanned surface vehicles. On 10 April 2023, the Turkish Naval Forces commissioned the world's first flight deck-based specialized military drone carrier, the TCG Anadolu, beginning the new era of drone carriers.

Drone carriers can be used for both civilian and (more commonly) military purposes. As a naval vessel, a drone carrier enables a fleet the ability to launch and retrieve combat drones (UCAVs) without the need for the larger aircraft carriers. In March 2013, DARPA began efforts to develop a fleet of small naval vessels capable of conducting drone warfare without the need for large and expensive carrier strike groups. Some drone carrier, such as the Type 076, carries aircraft catapult to launch heavy weight jet-propelled fixed-wing drones.

In November 2014, US DoD made an open request for ideas on how to build an airborne aircraft carrier that can launch and retrieve drones using existing military aircraft such as the B-1B, B-52 or C-130.

== Developmental history ==
=== Turkey ===
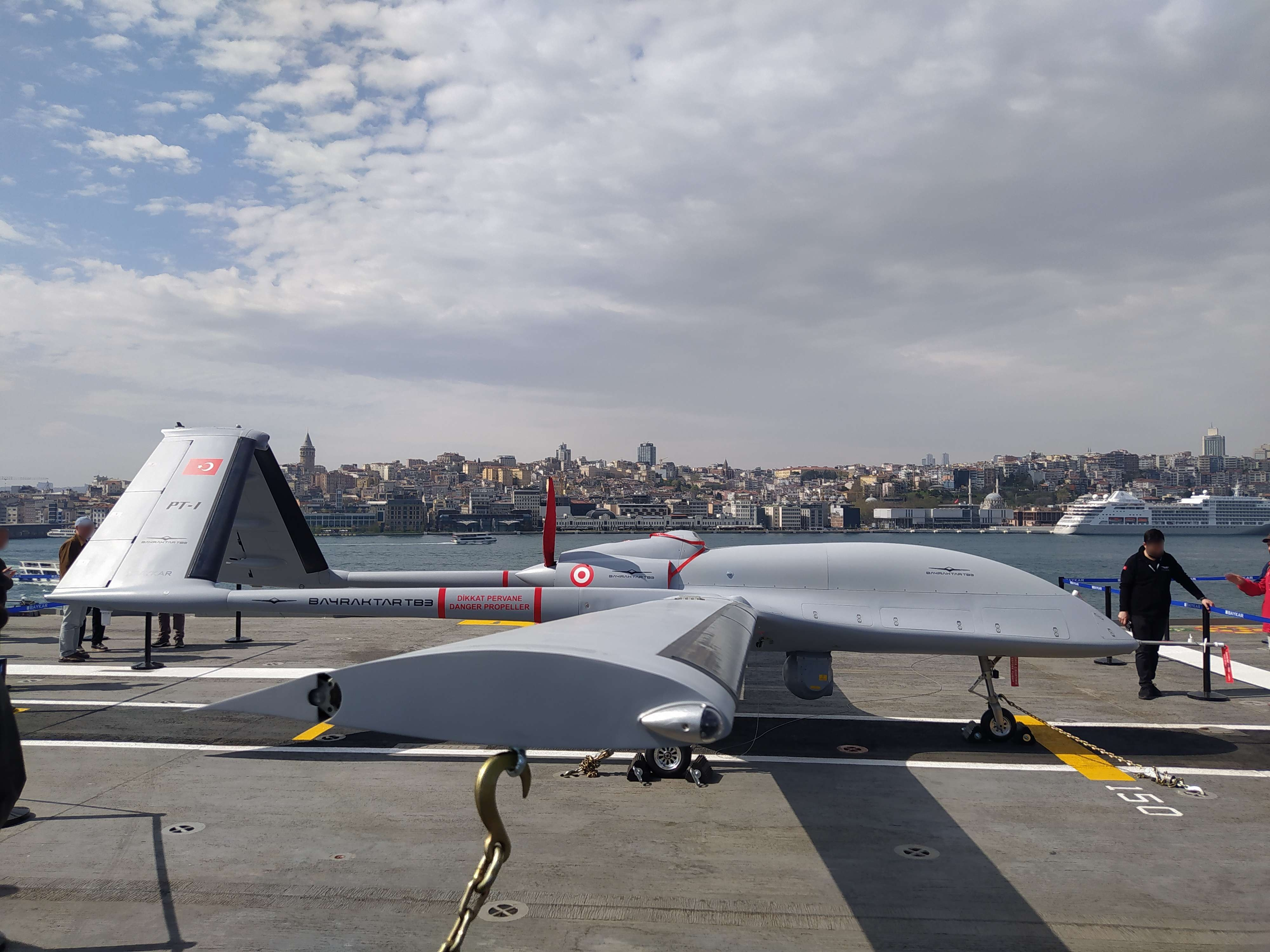
Carrier-based UCAV Baykar Bayraktar TB3 on the deck of TCG Anadolu

In February 2021, President of the Turkish Presidency of Defense Industries (SSB) Ismail Demir made public a new type of UAV being developed by Baykar that is planned to be stationed on Turkey's made world's first drone carrier, TCG Anadolu. The new aircraft Baykar Bayraktar TB3 developed for the drone carrier equipped with a local engine developed by TEI. According to the initial plans, the ship was expected to be equipped with F-35B fighter jets, but following the removal of Turkey from the procurement program, the vessel entered into a modification process to be able to accommodate UAVs. Mr. Demir stated that between 30 and 50 folding-winged Bayraktar TB3 UAVs will be able to land and take off using the deck of Anadolu.

On 19 November 2024, Baykar Bayraktar TB3 UAV successfully landed and took-off from TCG Anadolu. It was the first time a fixed-wing unmanned aircraft of this size and class had successfully landed on a short-runway of a carrier ship.

On 18 February 2026, the Bayraktar TB3 successfully performed a flight demonstration from the TCG Anadolu in the Baltic region during NATO's Steadfast Dart 2026 exercise. The drone operated effectively in strong winds, freezing temperatures and heavy snowfall. The drone also successfully hit surface targets at sea with two MAM-L precision-guided munitions. After this, the Bayraktar TB3 also completed an eight-hour joint sortie with multiple Eurofighter Typhoon fighters of the German Air Force in Baltic Sea during the exercise. During this exercise with the Eurofighter Typhoons, the Bayraktar TB-3 was covered 1,700 kilometers on its mission. The drone also captured aerial video of the Eurofighter Typhoon using its ASELFLIR 500 electro-optical reconnaissance, surveillance and targeting system made by the Turkish company Aselsan. This mission marked a significant integration of unmanned aerial vehicles with advanced fighter jets in a multinational drill with performing manned-unmanned teaming. The operation demonstrated the drone carrier TCG Anadolu's capability to operate effectively within high-intensity long-range alliance maneuvers.

=== China ===
On May 18, 2022, the first Chinese unmanned drone carrier named Zhu Hai Yun ("Zhuhai Cloud"), an oceanography research vessel, was launched in Guangzhou, Guangdong Province in China, intended to advance marine research and economics. In May 2024, a possible drone carrier, with a catamaran layout and low flight deck, was spotted in the Jiangsu Dayang Marine Shipyards.

The Type 076 landing helicopter dock is a class of amphibious assault ship hosting aviation facilities for fixed-wing aircraft. Analysts long predicted it could be used as a drone carrier.. In 2025, Captain Chi Jianjun, a Chinese Navy official, confirmed that the Type 076 warship will operate UAVs, as will many other vessels in the PLAN.

=== Iran ===
Iran also built a drone carrier (named Shahid Bagheri) with an estimated 160 to 180m long flight deck by converting a container ship. It is reported that several kinds of drones (60 drones) and helicopters can take off from and land on the said carrier. She also carry several anti-ship and anti-air missiles for protection and 30 (50 speedboats) Ashura-class missile speedboats with herself. The vessel was sunk in the 2026 Iran war.

=== Portugal ===
Portuguese navy plans, for the second half of 2026, to deliver the NRP D. João II, a platform ship capable of operating aerial, surface and underwater drones, as well as medium (Sikorsky UH-60 Black Hawk) and heavy (EH101 Merlin) helicopters of the Portuguese air force.

=== South Korea ===
On 12 November 2024, the South Korean Navy conducted a Gray Eagle STOL UAV take-off test aboard the amphibious assault ship ROKS Dokdo to test the ship's ability to carry fixed-wing UAVs. The Gray Eagle UAV took off from Dokdo, flew twice close to her port side to perform a "simulated landing procedure", but did not land on the ship. The Korean company Hanwha Ocean has presented several concepts for the production of UAV carrier or carriers of other unmanned vehicles in its proposed project called Ghost Commander.

On 9 June 2021, at the Korean maritime exhibition MADEX, two companies, Daewoo Shipbuilding and Marine Engineering (DSME) and Hyundai Heavy Industries (HHI), exhibited a mock-up of a light aircraft carrier as a new design for CVX-class aircraft carrier. However, on 11 May 2025, the South Korean Navy announced revisions to its light aircraft carrier plan and announced that it would carry UAVs instead of F-35B fighters.

At the exhibition "Seoul ADEX 2025", which was held from October 17 to 24, 2025, Hanwha Ocean unveiled the mockup Ghost Commander II, which attracted attention as the South Korean Navy used the CVX concept as a UAV mothership. The company also exhibited a mock-up of the same type of ship at MADEX 2025, and as at that time, the displacement was set at 42,000 tons, which is comparable to the displacement of various CVX proposals.

=== United Kingdom ===
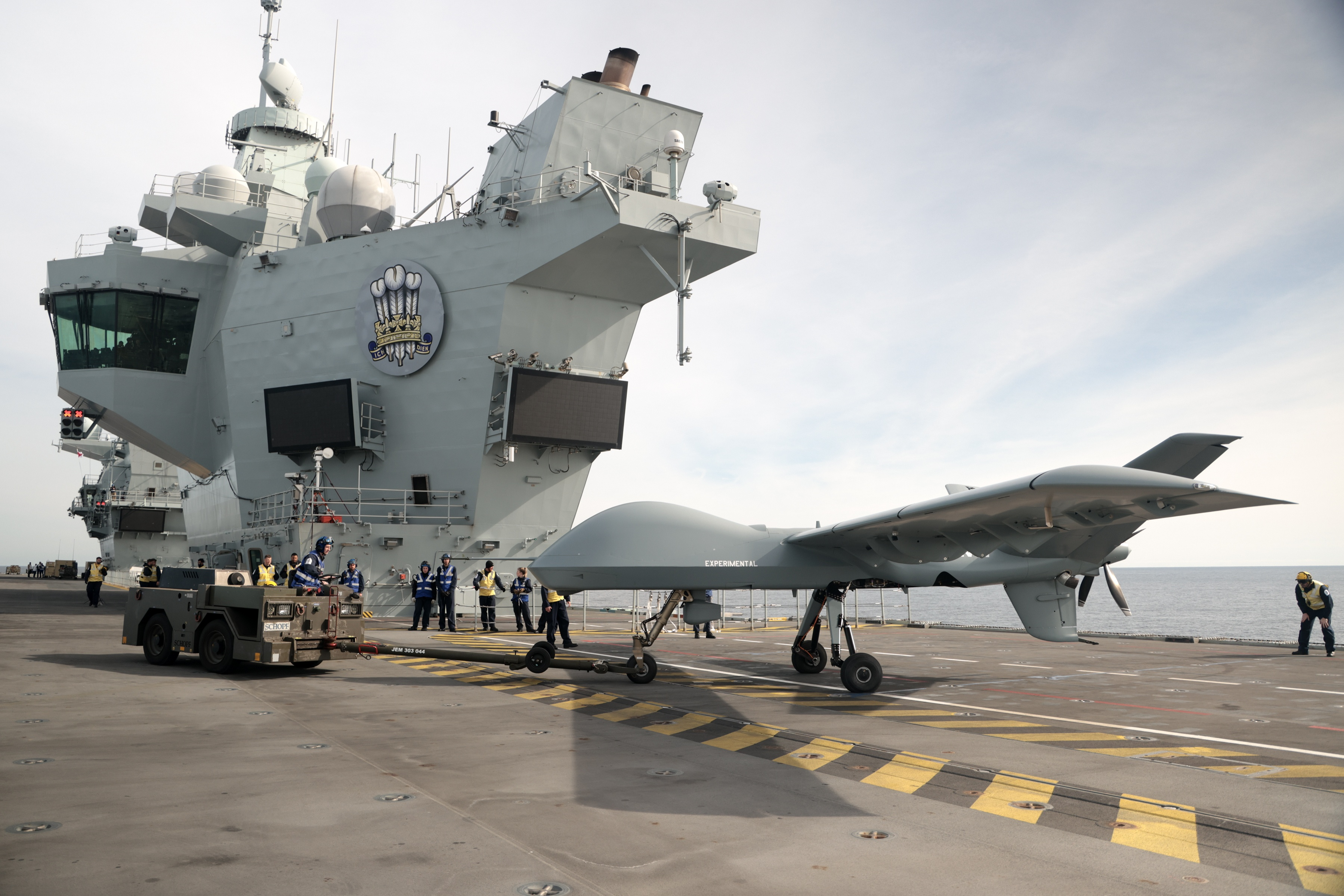
The first prototype of the General Atomics Mojave onboard HMS Prince of Wales in November 2023.

In 2000s, in the UK the UXV Combatant, which would have been a ship dedicated to UCAVs, was proposed for the Royal Navy.

The Royal Navy intends to operate fixed-wing drones from its two Queen Elizabeth-class aircraft carriers to boost their combat mass. In trials, it successfully launched and recovered a Qinetiq Banshee Jet 80+ target drone, a W Autonomous Systems made UAV and a General Atomics Mojave prototype. Under Project Ark Royal, it is considering the installation of catapults and arrestor systems to launch and recover larger drones which are being procured under Project Vixen. Royal Navy briefings have used a carrier-based variant of the MQ-28 Ghost Bat as a representative of Vixen, and General Atomics has proposed its Gambit 5. It is reported that HMS Prince of Wales’ flight deck would require an overhaul to deploy bigger combat drones.

== See also ==
- Aviation-capable naval vessel
- Carrier-based aircraft
- Aircraft cruiser
  - Interdiction Assault Ship
- Battlecarrier
- Helicopter carrier
- Unmanned combat aerial vehicle
- HMS Argus (I49)
- JDS Azuma
