= UXV Combatant =

Carrier Warship

- Artist depiction of the UXV Combatant

General characteristics
- Type: Drone carrier
- Displacement: 8,000 t (7,900 long tons; 8,800 short tons)
- Length: 500 ft (152.4 m)
- Beam: 70 ft (21 m)
- Speed: 27 knots (50 km/h; 31 mph)
- Complement: 60
- Armament: 20-cell vertical launching system; 1 × 155 mm gun; 1–4 × CIWS
- Aircraft carried: Mixture of: UAVs; UACVs; V/STOL aircraft; Helicopters
- Aviation facilities: A large V-shaped flight deck; A hangar deck

The UXV Combatant is a concept UAV drone carrier aviation capable warship designed by BVT Surface Fleet (now BAE Systems Maritime – Naval Ships), which was displayed at the Defence Security and Equipment International (DSEI) in 2007. UXV Combatant shares some common design features with the Type 45 destroyer and the Interdiction Assault Ship concept.

== Design ==
[Designed to] launch, operate and recover large numbers of small unmanned vehicles for extended periods, the UXV plays the role of mother ship - a permanent base and control centre for the futuristic unmanned land, sea and air vehicles before, during and on completion of their missions.

— BAE Systems

The UXV design features two angled flight decks for launching unmanned aerial vehicles, V/STOL aircraft, and helicopters; arrayed in a "V" shape, similar to that of the Interdiction Assault Ship concept. Each flight deck is approximately 164 feet (50 m) in length. To launch aircraft, it could be expected to use the Electromagnetic Aircraft Launch System or a ski-jump.

It was also reported to be capable of launching unmanned underwater vehicles via a "moon pool", and in addition, able to embark a large number of troops plus their equipment in the assault ship role. For naval gunfire support, the design is equipped with a 155 mm cannon, able to fire bursts of 20 rounds in rapid succession. It also features a vertical launching system.

== Mission ==
UXV Combatant is designed to better meet the threats of asymmetric warfare. Able to deploy assault troops or special forces ashore with their equipment, it is designed to provide the necessary firepower to support them. Such as; land-attack cruise missile launched via its vertical launching system, its 155 mm gun, and a fleet of unmanned combat aerial vehicles. UXV Combatant is also designed to perform reconnaissance missions, with powerful ship-borne sensors and unmanned aerial vehicles. UXV Combatant is designed to act both independently, or as an escort.

== Current status ==
This is a concept warship only, and there are currently no plans yet for this concept to enter design proper.
