= Aviation-capable naval vessel =

Ship capable of supporting aircraft activities

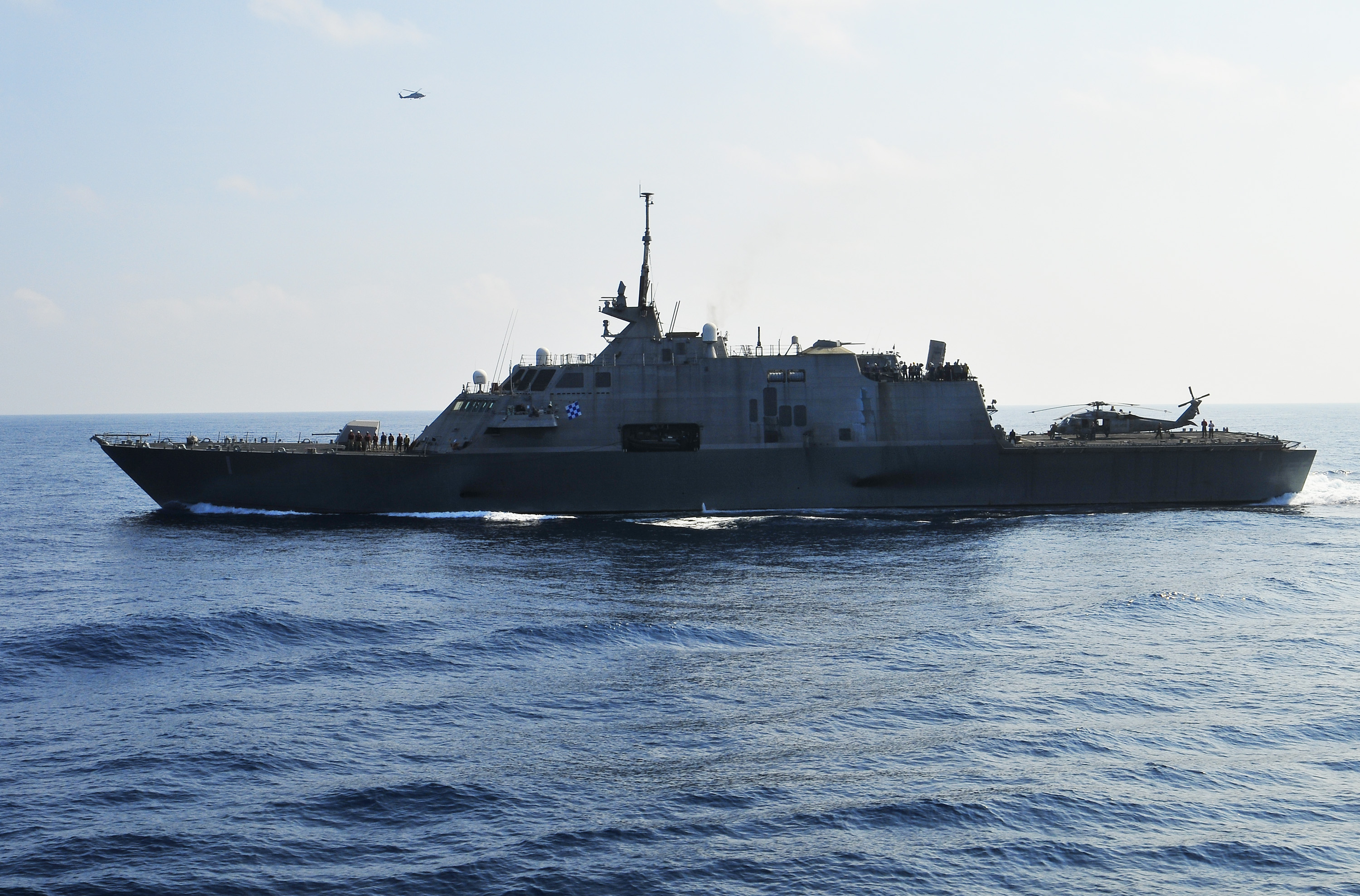
View of a Freedom-class littoral combat ship with a Sikorsky SH-60 Seahawk helicopter on her deck

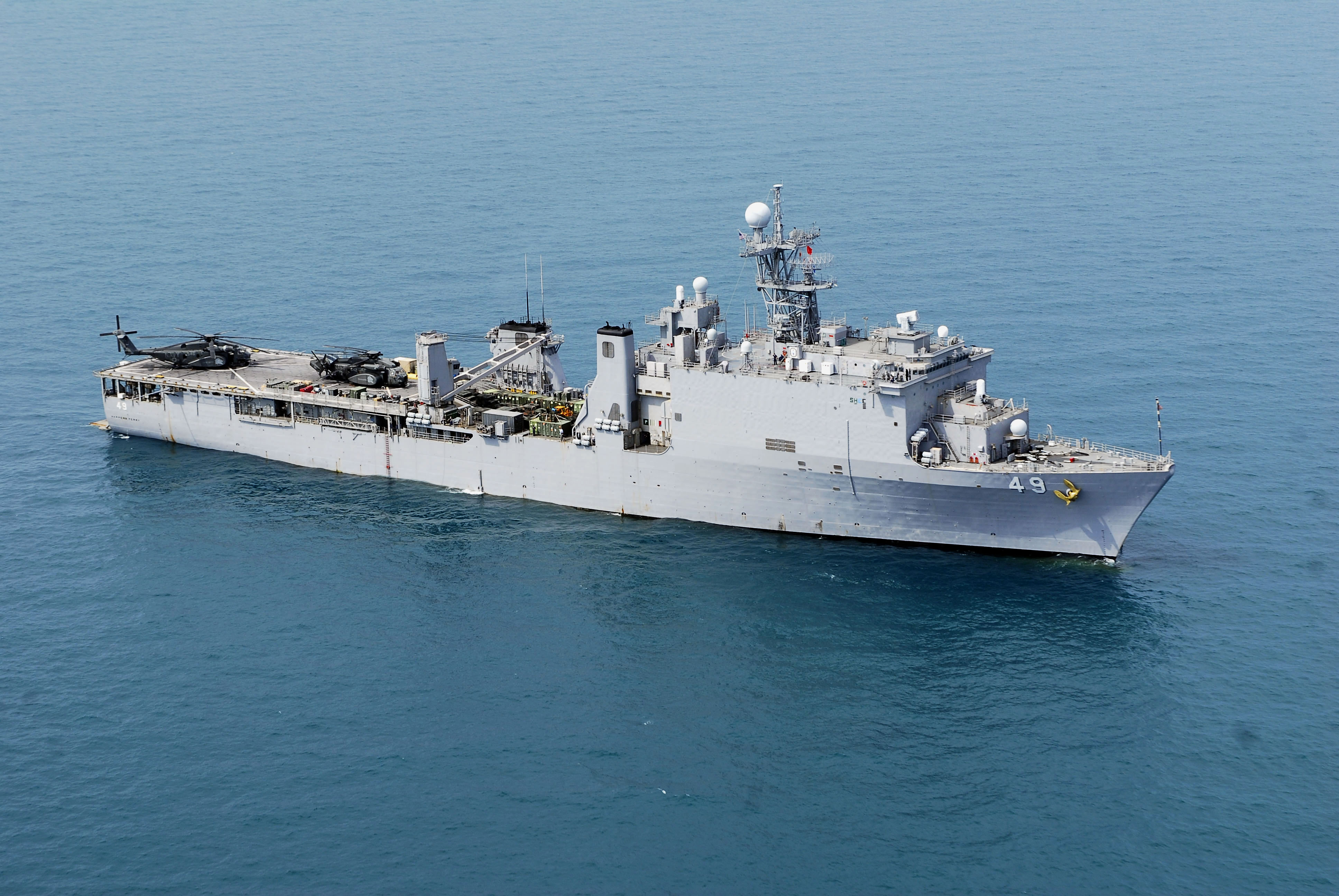
A pair of MH-53E Sea Dragons sitting on the deck of a Harpers Ferry-class dock landing ship

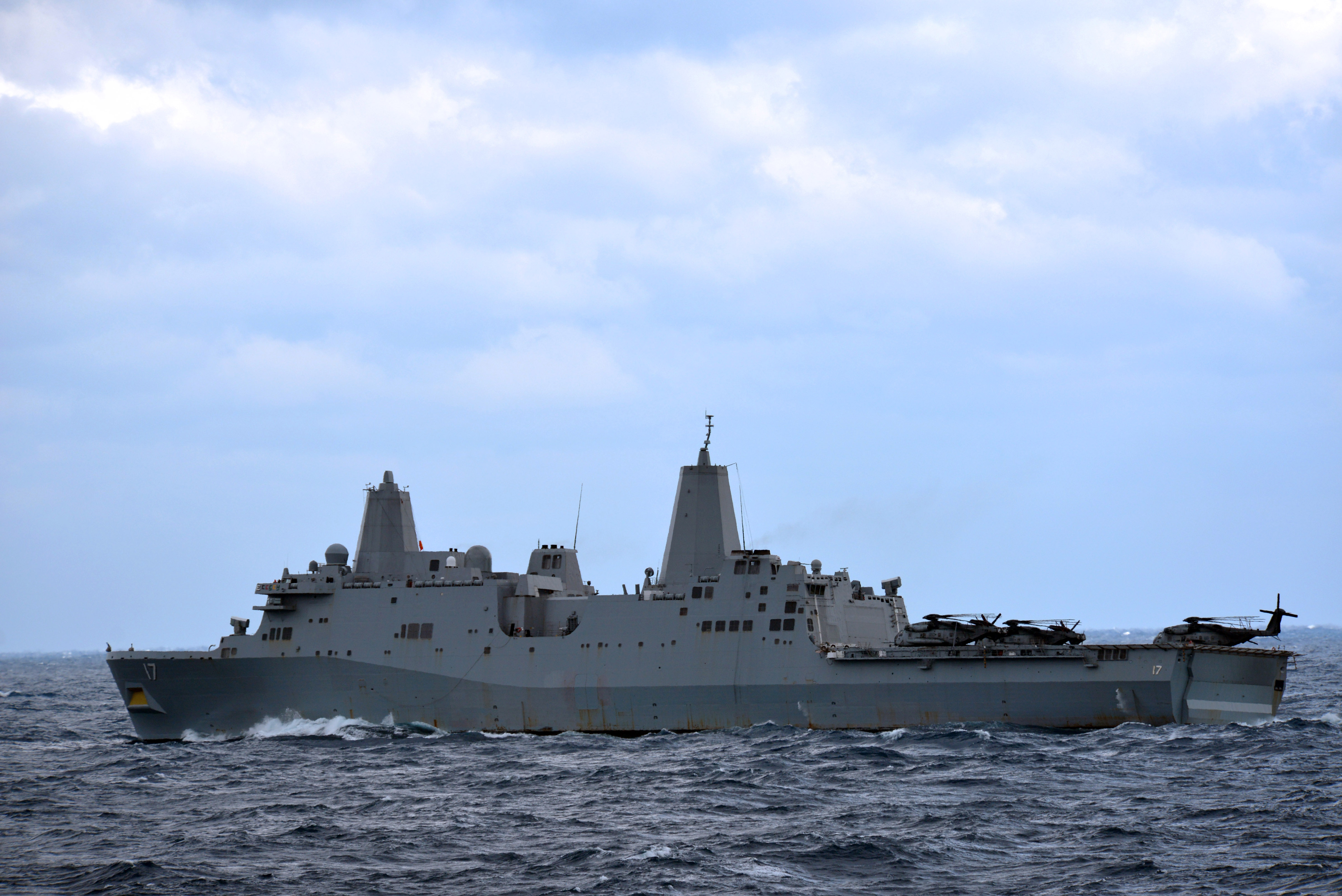
A trio of CH-53E Super Stallions on the deck of a San Antonio-class amphibious transport dock

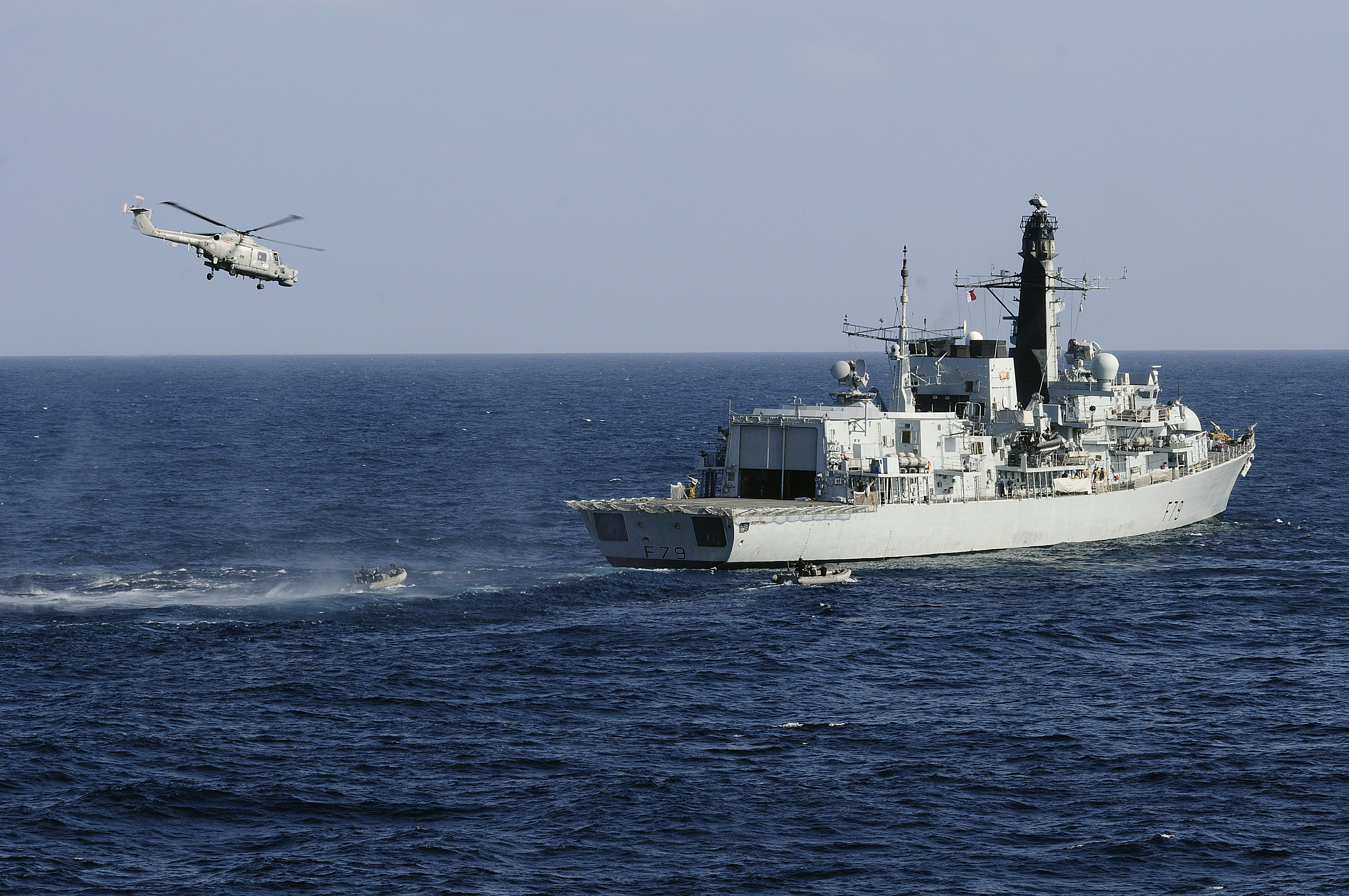
View of a Lynx HMA8 helicopter flying toward the landing pad on a Type 23 or Duke-class frigate

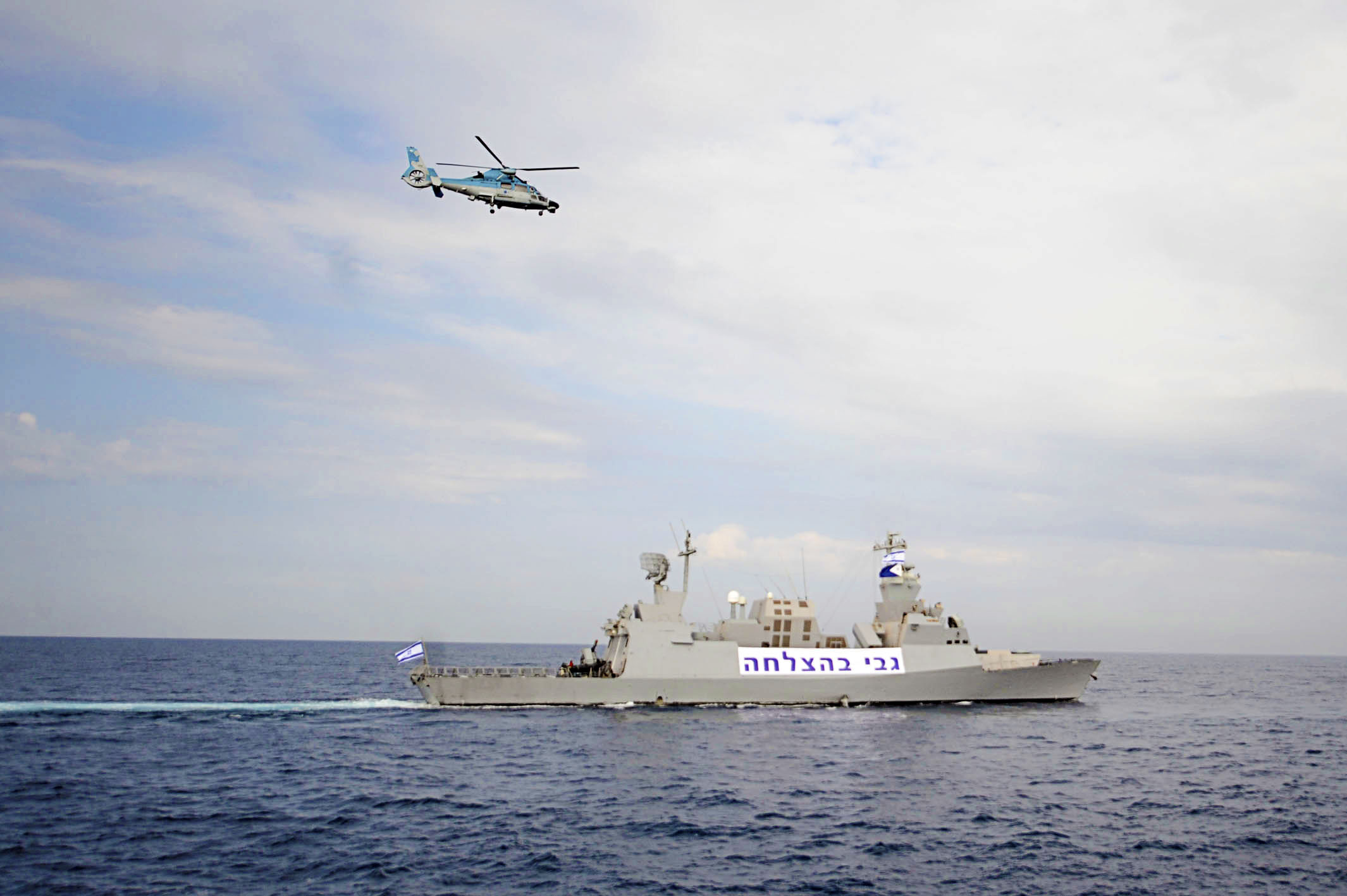
An IAF Eurocopter AS565 Panther helicopter hovers above a Sa'ar 5-class corvette

Many modern naval vessels are capable of carrying and supporting aircraft, although only aircraft carriers and amphibious assault ships with full-length flight decks are truly dedicated to naval aviation, especially operation of fixed-wing aircraft. VTOL aircraft such as helicopters can however adapted well to most surface vessels as long as there is sufficient space on the top deck for safe takeoff and landing.

A majority of United States Navy (USN) ships have at least a stern helipad, capable of landing medium-sized naval helicopters for maritime patrol, search and rescue and anti-submarine missions. Many others even have hangars incorporated into the structure of the ship. It has become a standard part of modern ship design to have a deck that supports medium or large helicopters, as well as being able to house them in a hangar, for protection and maintenance.

Aside from aircraft carriers (hull symbol CVN) and amphibious assault ships (LPH, LHA and LHD), the USN has 12 classes of commissioned surface warships, 10 of which are aviation-capable. Two of those classes, patrol crafts (PC) and mine warfare vessels (AM), are due to be replaced by the more versatile littoral combat ship (LCS), at which point the entire USN surface war fleet will be aviation-capable.

== US Navy ships ==
As of 2016, the current types and classes of US Navy ships, along with their capabilities are as follows:

Type	Hull code	Class	Aircraft carried
Amphibious Command Ship	(LCC)	Blue Ridge	2 × Sikorsky SH-60 Seahawk helicopters
Amphibious transport dock	(LPD) (AFSB(I))	San Antonio; Austin	up to 4 or 6 × CH-46 Sea Knight or up to 5 × MV-22 Osprey Tilt-rotors. (also fixed-wing aircraft, such as the AV-8B Harrier II V/STOL jet, in an emergency - see USS Green Bay AV-8B Harrier testing)
Cruiser	(CG)	Ticonderoga	2 × Sikorsky SH-60B or MH-60R Seahawk LAMPS III helicopters.
Destroyer	(DDG)	Arleigh Burke	up to 2 × MH-60R LAMPS III helicopters
Dock landing ship	(LSD)	Harpers Ferry; Whidbey Island	2 × CH-53E Super Stallion or 3 × CH-46 Sea Knight helicopters
Littoral combat ship	(LCS)	Freedom; Independence	2 × MH-60R/S Seahawk and 1 × MQ-8 Fire Scout
Submarine tender	(AS)	Emory S. Land	none (equipped with platform for medium helicopter)

Along with these types and classes, many of the US navy's non-commissioned ships, specifically those of the Military Sealift Command, are aviation-capable as well. The United States Coast Guard also has cutters that are aviation-capable. Also, with the growing technology in UAVs and UCAVs, virtually every ship afloat has, or will soon have, some type of aviation capability.

== Other vessels ==
The following are examples of other types aviation-capable vessels from other navies around the world:

Type	National Navy	Class	Aircraft carried
Amphibious transport dock	Chilean Navy	Foudre	4 × helicopters
Command ship	Royal Danish Navy	Absalon	2 × EH-101 helicopters
Corvette	Israeli Navy	Sa'ar 5	1 × helicopter
Cruiser	Russian Navy	Slava	1 × Kamov Ka-25 or Kamov Ka-27 helicopter
Destroyer	People's Liberation Army Navy (China)	Type 052B or Guangzhou	1 × Kamov Ka-27 helicopter
Dock landing ship	Royal Australian Navy	Bay	none (can accommodate Chinook-sized helicopters and Osprey-sized tilt-rotors on its deck)
Frigate	Royal Navy (UK)	Type 23 or Duke	1 × Lynx HMA8 or 1 × Westland Merlin HM1
Landing platform dock	Spanish Navy	Galicia	4 × SH-3 Sea King or 6 × NH-90 helicopters
Landing Ship, Tank	Hellenic Navy (Greece)	Jason	none (equipped with platform for medium helicopter)
Helicopter carrier	Japan Maritime Self-Defense Force	Hyūga	3 × SH-60K, 1 × MCH-101

== Other types ==
- Battlecarrier
- Merchant aircraft carrier
- Submarine aircraft carrier
- Aircraft cruiser
- CAM ship
- Drone carrier
- Fighter catapult ship
- Interdiction Assault Ship
- Seaplane tender

== See also ==
- List of current United States Navy ships
- List of Military Sealift Command ships
- United States Coast Guard Cutter
- Timeline for aircraft carrier service
- List of amphibious warfare ships
- List of aircraft carriers
