= Italian cruiser Vittorio Veneto =

Ship in the Italian Navy

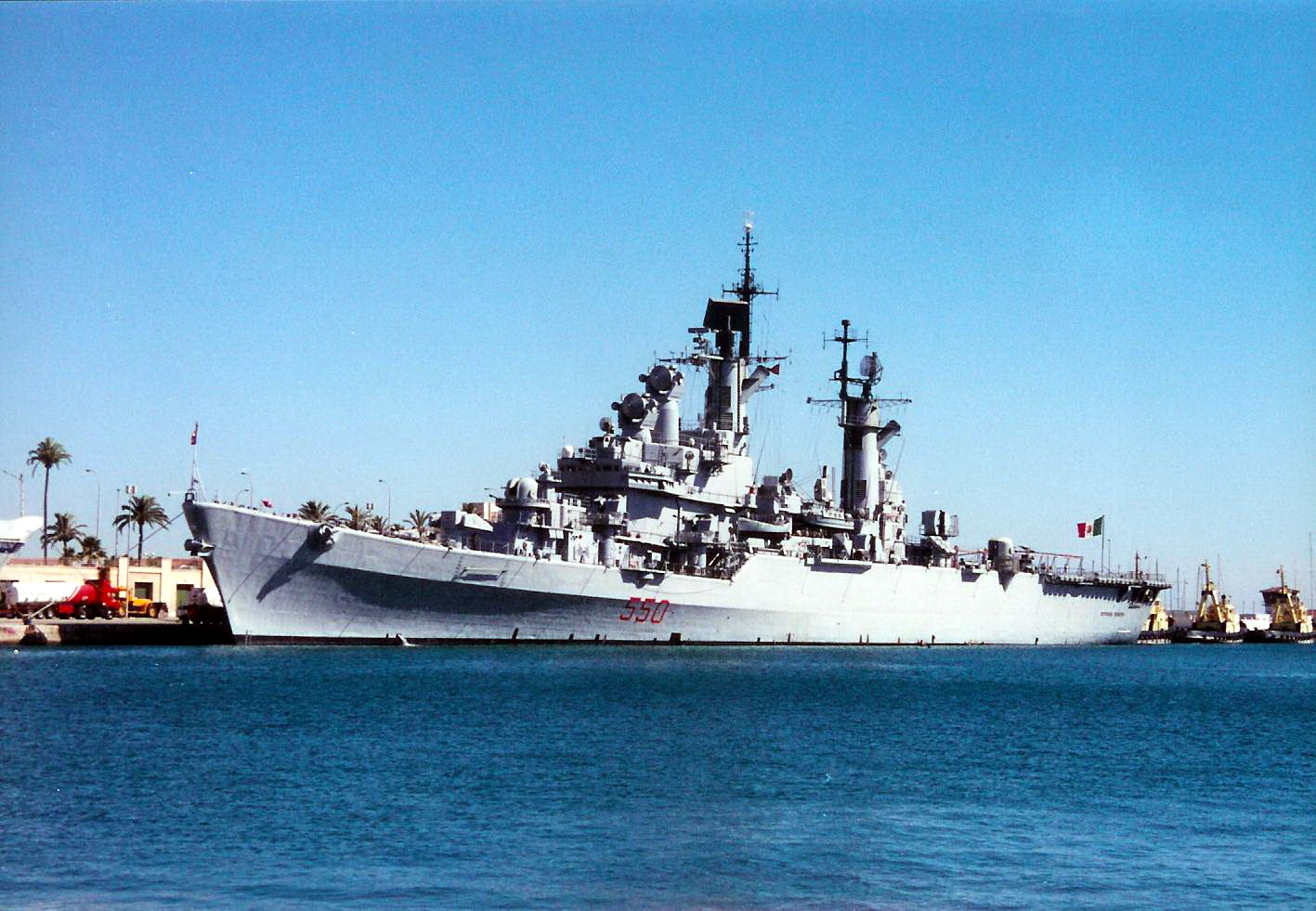
- Vittorio Veneto in 2001

History

Italy
- Name: Vittorio Veneto
- Namesake: Vittorio Veneto
- Builder: Italcantieri, Castellammare di Stabia shipyard
- Laid down: 10 June 1965
- Launched: 5 February 1967
- Commissioned: 12 July 1969
- Decommissioned: Placed into reserve 1 November 2003; Decommissioned 29 June 2006
- Home port: Taranto
- Identification: - Pennant number: 550; - Hull number: 639 (790)
- Motto: Victoria nobis vita
- Fate: Scrapped at Aliaga Turkey 2021

General characteristics
- Type: Helicopter cruiser
- Displacement: 7,500 tons standard; 9,550 tons full loaded
- Length: 179.6 m (589 ft)
- Beam: 19.4 m (64 ft)
- Draught: 6.0 m (19.7 ft)
- Installed power: 4 Foster Wheeler boilers, 73,000 shp (54,000 kW)
- Propulsion: 2 shaft geared turbines
- Speed: 30.5 knots (56.5 km/h; 35.1 mph)
- Range: 5,000 nautical miles (9,300 km; 5,800 mi) at 16 knots (30 km/h; 18 mph)
- Complement: 557
- Sensors & processing systems: 1 × SPS-52 early warning radar; 1 × SPS-768 long range radar; 1 × SPQ-2 surface radar; 2 × SPG-55 missile fire control radar; 4 × Orion 10X fire control radar; 2 × Orion 20X fire control radar; 1 × navigation radar
- Electronic warfare & decoys: 2 × SCLAR decoy launcher; 1 × ECM system; 1 × TACAN
- Armament: As built: 1 × Mk 10 twin-arm launcher for 40 RIM-2 Terrier and 20 ASROC missiles; 8 × Oto Melara 76/62mm MMI or 76/62 mm Compact gun; 2 × 324 mm triple torpedo tubes; Post 1980-1982 modernization: 1 × Mk 10 twin-arm launcher with 40 Standard SM-1ER and 20 RUR-5 "ASROC" missiles; 8 × Oto Melara 76 mm (3 in)/62 MMI or Compact gun; 3 × Oto Melara Twin 40 mm (1.6 in)/L70 DARDO; 4 × OTOMAT SSMs; 2 × 324 mm triple torpedo tubes
- Aircraft carried: 9 Augusta AB204 or Augusta AB 212 helicopters or 6 AB-61 helicopters

Vittorio Veneto was a helicopter cruiser that served with the Italian Navy. Originally intended to be a class of two ships specifically designed for anti-submarine warfare (ASW), only Vittorio Veneto entered into service in 1969, its sister ship Italia being cancelled. Vittorio Veneto was placed into reserve in 2003 and decommissioned in 2006. This ship has the same general layout as the smaller Andrea Doria-class helicopter cruisers, but with two elevators in the flight deck and the hangar below, rather than with the hangar as part of the superstructure. It was named for the decisive Battle of Vittorio Veneto which ended World War I on the Italian front.

== Design ==
Vittorio Veneto has a displacement of 7,500 tons standard and 8,850 tons fully loaded. Unlike the Andrea Dorias, which had separate funnels, it has two combination mast/funnels. The second major difference in design is the location of the helicopter facilities. Vittorio Veneto has a raised rear deck to accommodate a hangar beneath the helicopter platform, rather than a frigate/destroyer style hangar in the superstructure. There are two elevators to transfer the helicopters between the hangar and the deck.

Originally the ship carried armament similar to the Andrea Dorias comprising a Terrier anti-aircraft system situated in front of the bridge, which could also be used to launch ASROC antisubmarine rockets. Compared to the Andrea Dorias, Vittorio Veneto's missile magazine has a third drum, increasing magazine capacity by a half to sixty rounds. The secondary armament comprised eight dual-purpose 76 mm (3 in) guns in a ring around the superstructure, similar to the Andrea Dorias. Finally, the vessel was armed with two triple 324 mm torpedo launchers. Vittorio Veneto could operate up to nine light helicopters, of the types Agusta-Bell AB-204 or later AB-212 or six heavy helicopters of the type AB-61, which could be housed in the hangar beneath the long rear deck.

The electronics were rather advanced for the time, comprising a three-dimensional AN/SPS-52 B radar and an SPS-768 (RAN 3L) air search radar. For anti-submarine warfare an AN/SQS-23 sonar set was installed.

Vittorio Veneto was propelled by two steam turbines providing 73,000 shp (54,000 kW), for a maximum speed of 30.5 knots (56.5 km/h; 35.1 mph). Like the previous class, the cruiser had a set of stabilizing fins to improve stability for helicopter operations.

=== Modifications ===
The ship underwent an extensive update between 1981 and 1984. The electronics were updated, and launchers for Otomat missiles were installed, together with three OTO Melara twin 40 mm (1.6 in) DARDO CIWS compact gun mounts for AA defence and Standard SM-1ER SAM missiles to replace the Terrier SAM. The engine feeding system was shifted from nafta to diesel fuel for standardisation and environmental reasons.

== History ==
Vittorio Veneto at sea

Although the Andrea Doria-class helicopter cruisers proved a useful addition to the fleet, it was judged that a larger ship was necessary. Such a vessel would be able operate a larger airwing and provide helicopter support in bad weather conditions. These considerations led to the Vittorio Veneto class, of which two ships were originally planned, though only one was actually built. The second ship of the class, Italia, was cancelled.

The ship was laid down on 10 June 1965 and launched on 5 February 1967. The cruiser was completed on 12 July 1969 at the Italcantieri plant of Castellammare di Stabia. It entered in service in the October of the same year, at the naval base of Taranto. Vittorio Veneto remained the flagship of the Italian Navy until the aircraft carrier Giuseppe Garibaldi was commissioned in 1985.

Vittorio Veneto ran aground in bad weather off the port of Vlorë on 22 April 1997. At the time it was acting as the flagship of a multinational task-force that protected aid deliveries to Albania. It took four tugboats to pull it free. No damage to the ship or injuries to the crew were reported by the Italian navy.

=== Decommissioning ===
After 1995 Vittorio Veneto served mainly as a training ship. It was decommissioned in 2003. At the time, it was the second to last cruiser in service with any Western European fleet, leaving only the French cruiser Jeanne d'Arc, which remained in service until 2010. Its air coverage capability is now supplied by the V/STOL aircraft carrier Cavour.

== See also ==
- List of cruisers

Equivalent helicopter carriers of the same era

- Jeanne d'Arc class
- Haruna class
- Moskva class

== Sources ==
- Gardiner, Robert; Chumbley, Stephen & Budzbon, Przemysław (1995). Conway's All the World's Fighting Ships 1947-1995. Annapolis, Maryland: Naval Institute Press. ISBN 1-55750-132-7.
