= Zhuhai Cloud =

Research vessel

History
- Name: Zhuhai Cloud
- Owner: Southern Marine Science and Engineering Guangdong Laboratory, Sun Yat-sen University
- Builder: China State Shipbuilding Corporation Huangpu Wenchong
- Laid down: July 2021
- Launched: May 2022

General characteristics
- Displacement: 2,000 tonnes
- Length: 88.5 metres (290 ft)
- Beam: 14 metres (46 ft)
- Speed: 13 knots (24 km/h; 15 mph); 18 knots (33 km/h; 21 mph) (maximum)

Zhuhai Cloud (Chinese: 朱海云; pinyin: Zhu Hai Yun) is a oceanography research vessel designed for uncrewed operations in open waters and as a mother ship for uncrewed vehicles. She has been called the first "drone mothership" and the first "unmanned vehicle carrier".

The ship was built by China State Shipbuilding Corporation's Huangpu Wenchong for Sun Yat-sen University's Southern Marine Science and Engineering Guangdong Laboratory. The laboratory's goal is to surveil an underwater and above water area 50 nautical miles in diameter using a network of unmanned devices.

Zhuhai Cloud may have military applications. Timothy Heath, a RAND Corporation analyst, believes these include accurately mapping depths for submarines, and deploying smart mines.
