= Tampion =

Cover for the muzzle of a gun

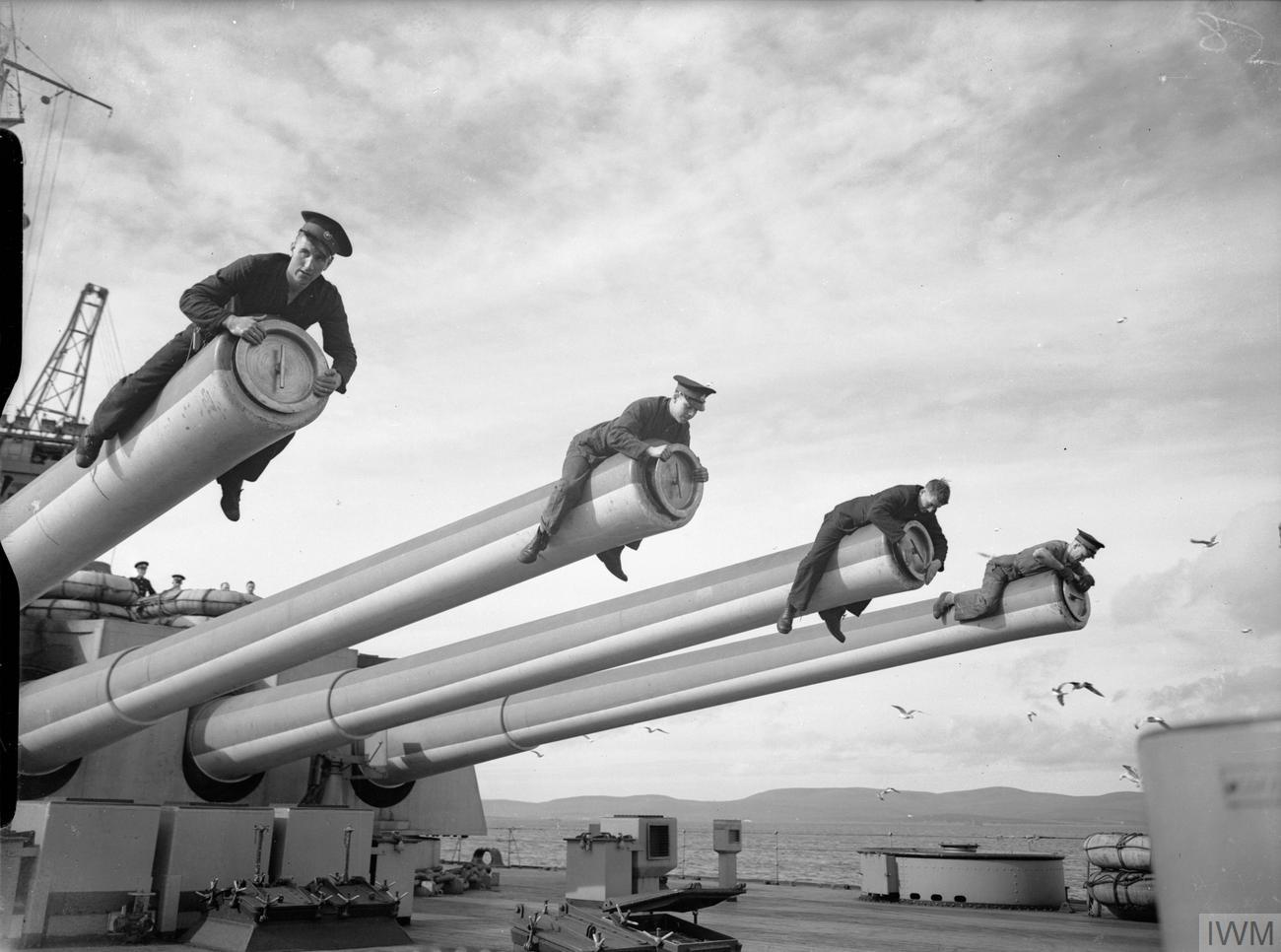
Royal Marines fitting tampions to the 14-inch (36 cm) guns of HMS Howe during World War II

A tampion or tompion (in the Royal Navy) is a wooden plug, or a metal, canvas, rubber, or plastic cover, for the muzzle of a gun, howitzer, or mortar. Tampions can be found on both land-based artillery and naval guns. Naval tampions have been developed into works of art.

== History ==
Although the cannon of ships of the line were protected as they were retracted inside the ships, many smaller vessels had exposed gundecks which required a plug to protect inside of the barrels. To combat rust when ships were not in action the barrels were sealed, both with a tampion and plugs in the touch hole. A quantity of olive oil and a round shot were left inside in the barrel; With the gun laid horizontally the shot would roll up and down the barrel as the ship caught each wave, effectively lubricating the gun simply through the motion of the ship.

Later, the invention of revolving gun turrets meant that all guns were constantly exposed to water. Hence, when not in use, naval guns were protected by wooden, and, later, rubber, muzzle plugs. They were also used to protect the barrel whenever the guns were placed in storage, for example in the hold where moisture could cause corrosion, and sealed in with putty.

Typically, rubber and plastic tampions can be shot through in case of an emergency. Plastic tampions are normally designed to be expelled by the build-up of pressure in the barrel as the first shell is fired.

Over time, tampions were embossed or engraved with the arms of the unit, and they became collector's items. This tradition has since extended to warships that typically would not carry heavy guns, such as submarines, having their own badges in the shape of a tampion.

== Images ==
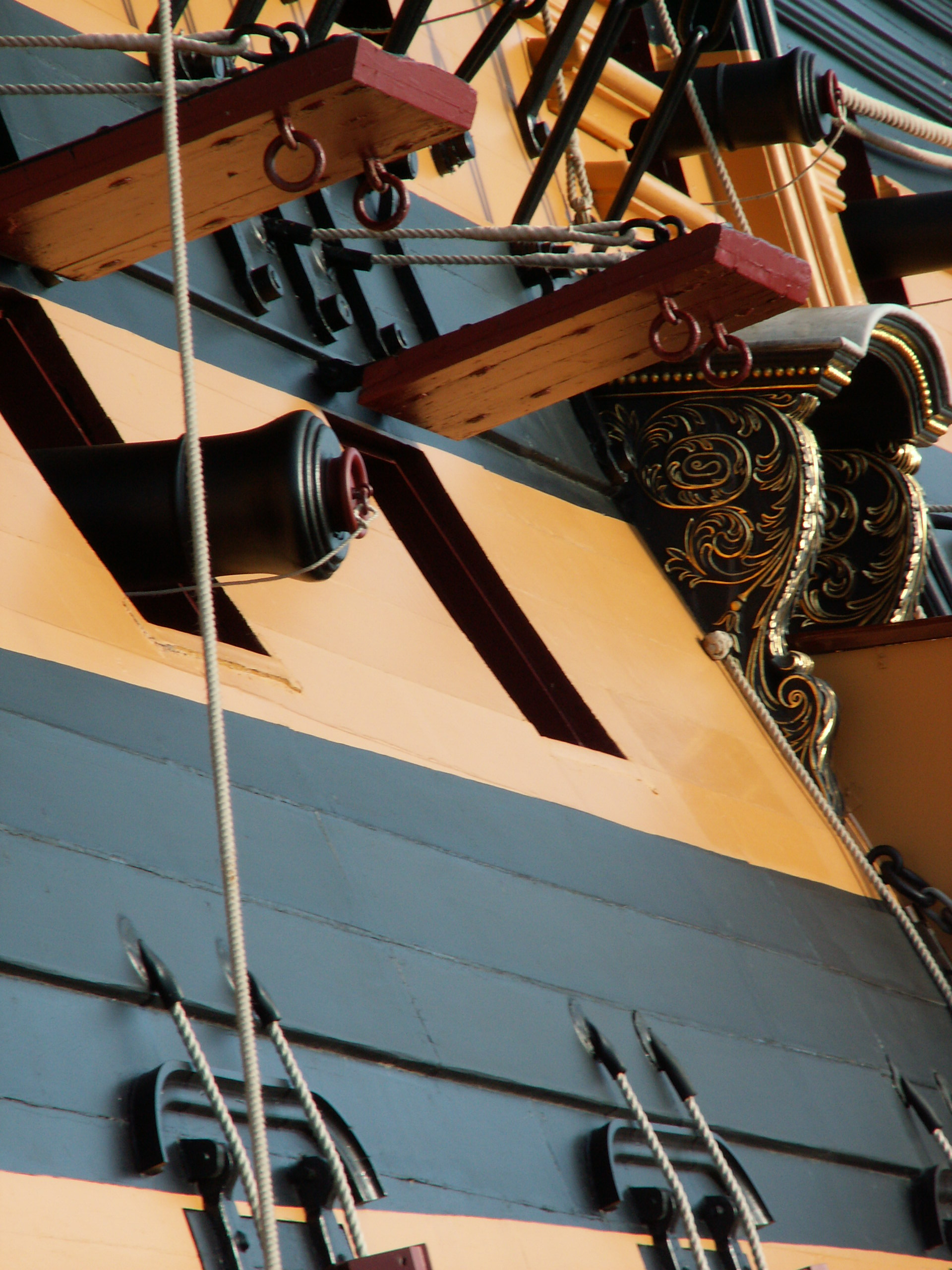
The muzzle of a 24-pounder cannon on the preserved ship of the line, HMS Victory. The red tampion is secured with a cord

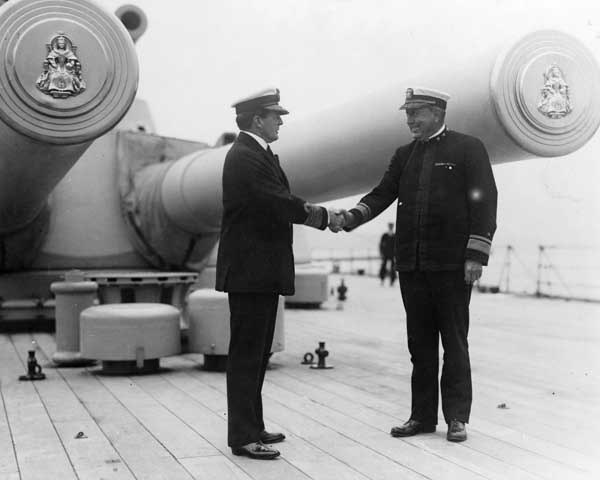
The tampions of the 15-inch guns on the British battleship HMS Queen Elizabeth in 1917

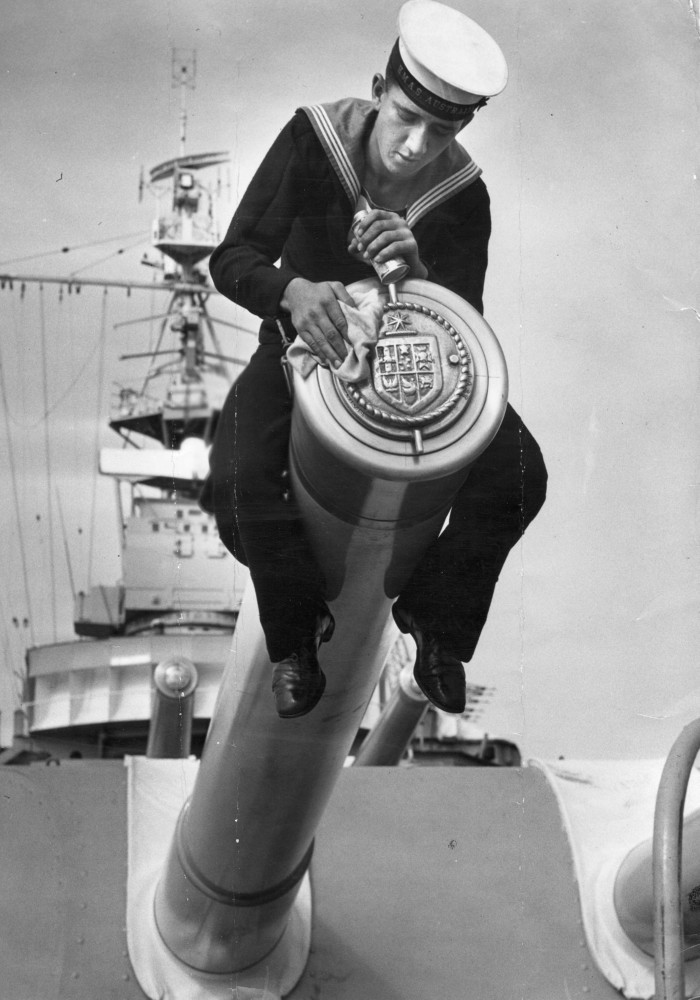
A sailor polishing the tampion of an 8-inch gun on the Australian heavy cruiser, HMAS Australia in the early 1950s.

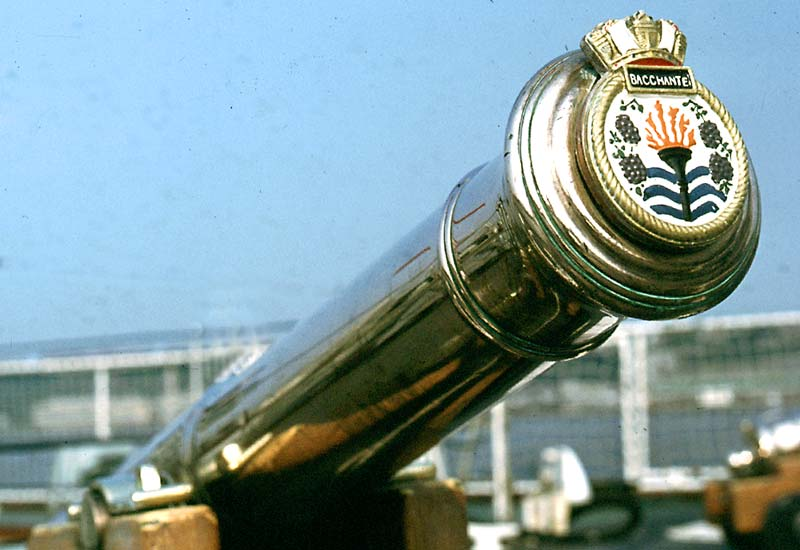
Tampion of a brass cannon with the crest of the British Leander-class frigate, HMS Bacchante in 1976

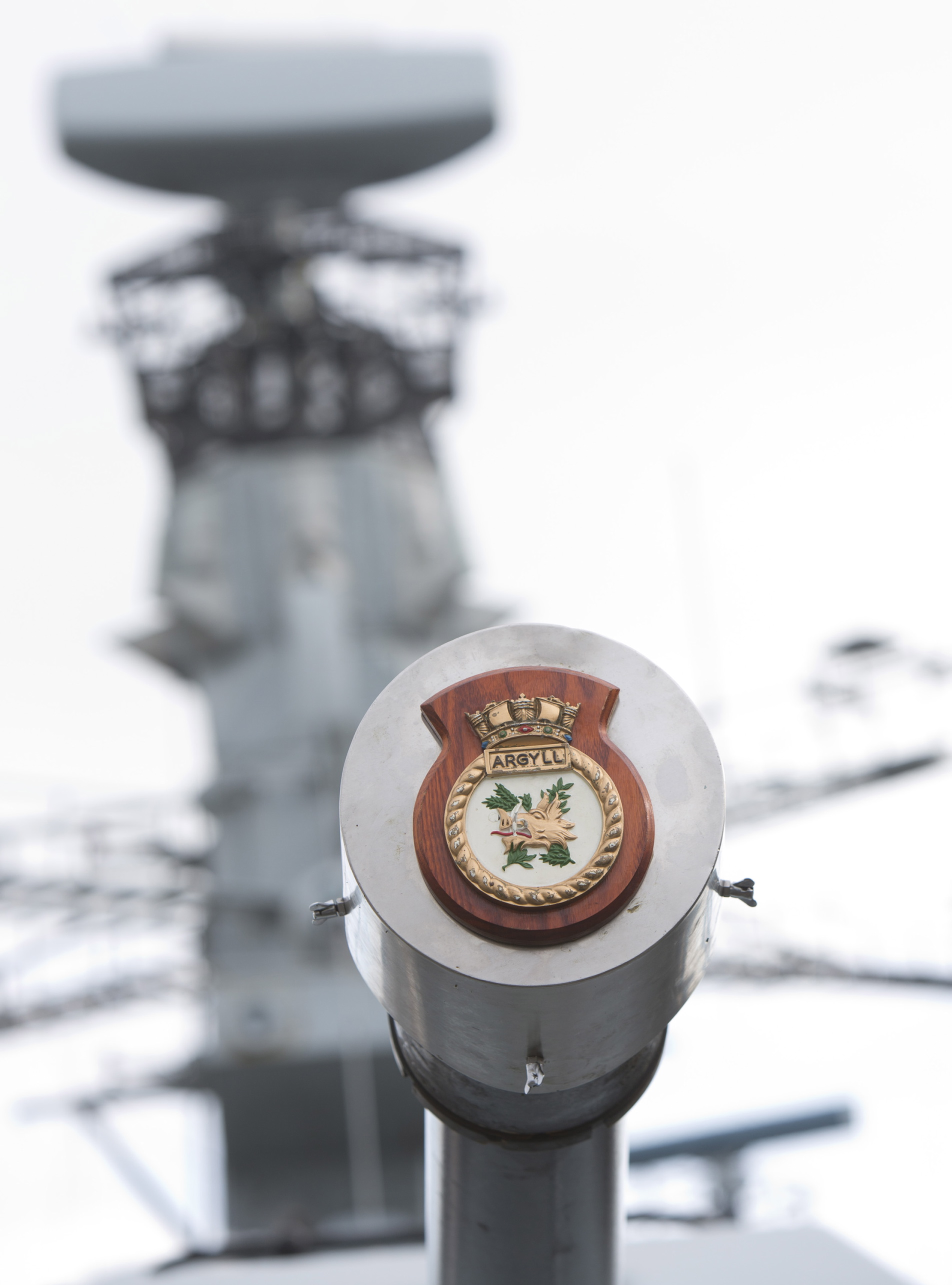
Tampion on the 4.5 inch gun of the British Type 23 frigate, HMS Argyll in 2014

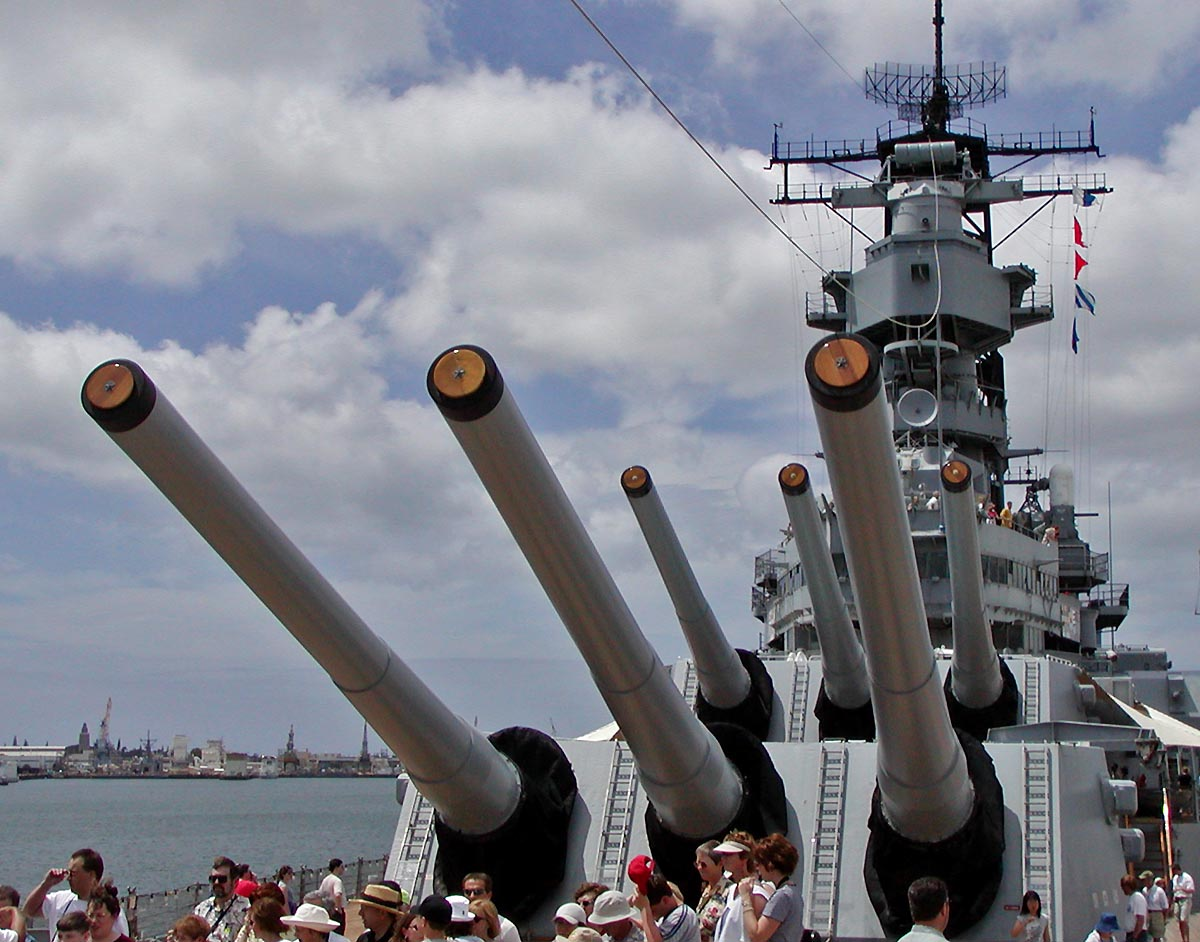
The tampions of the 16-inch guns on the US battleship, USS Missouri in 2002

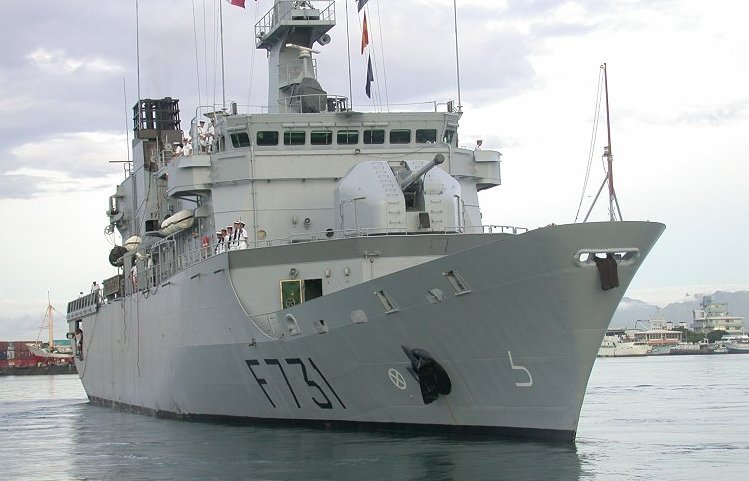
The 100 mm gun of the French frigate Prairial sealed by a tampion

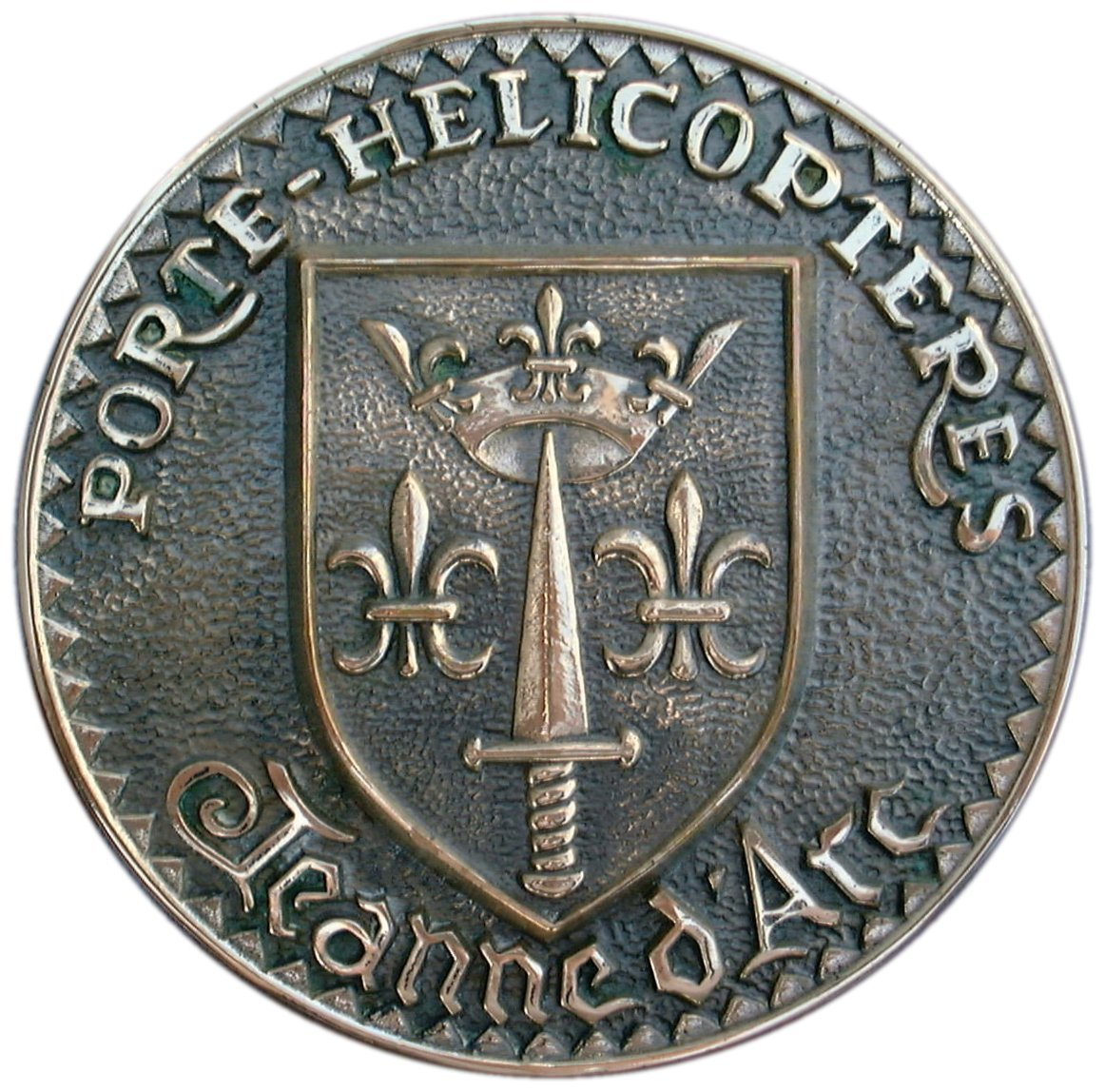
Tampion of the French cruiser Jeanne d'Arc

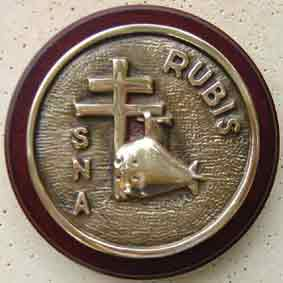
Tampion of the French submarine Rubis

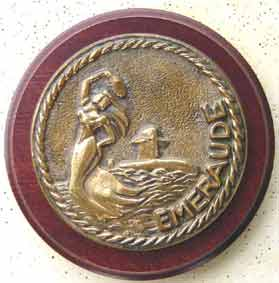
Tampion of the French submarine Émeraude

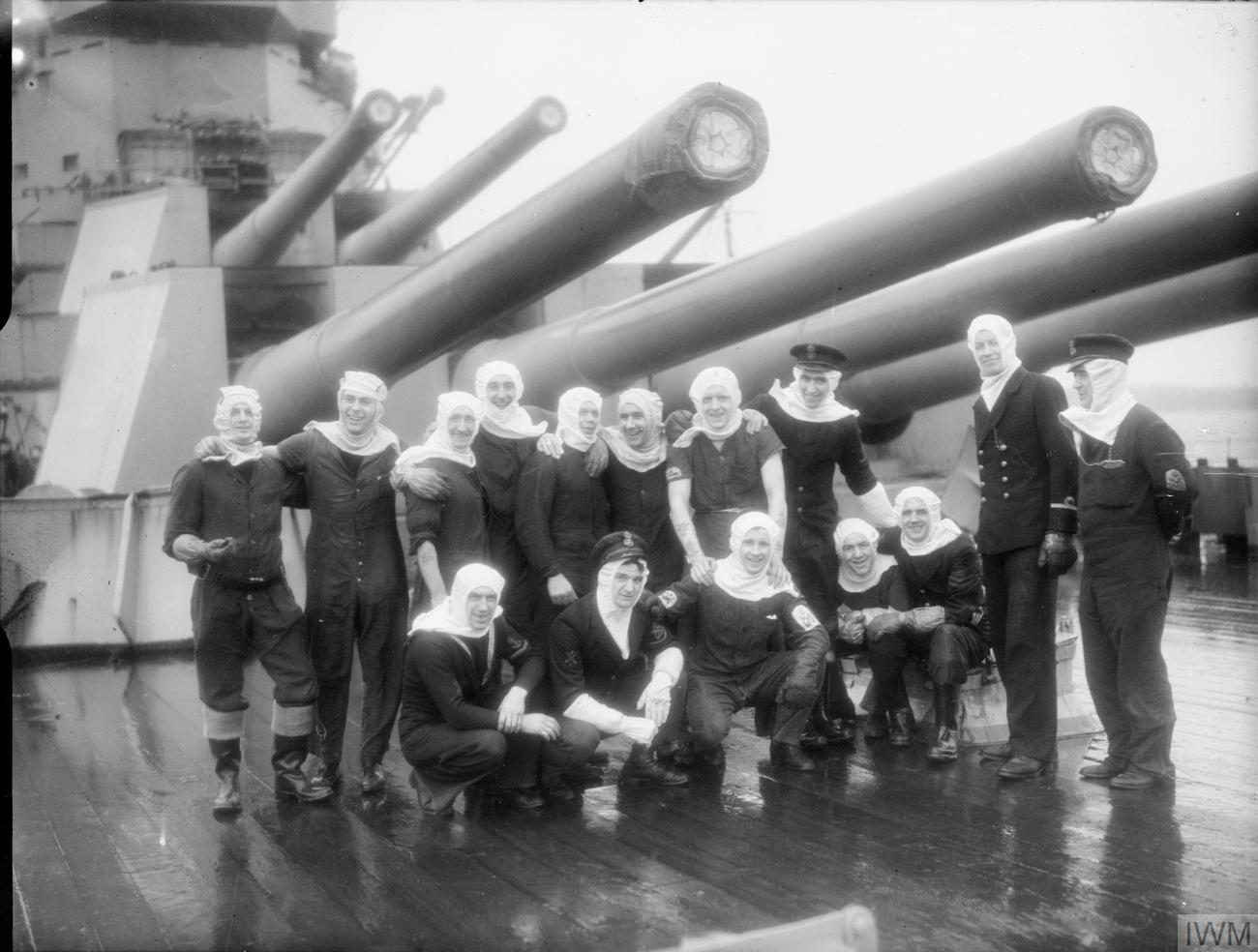
Rain covers on HMS Duke of York

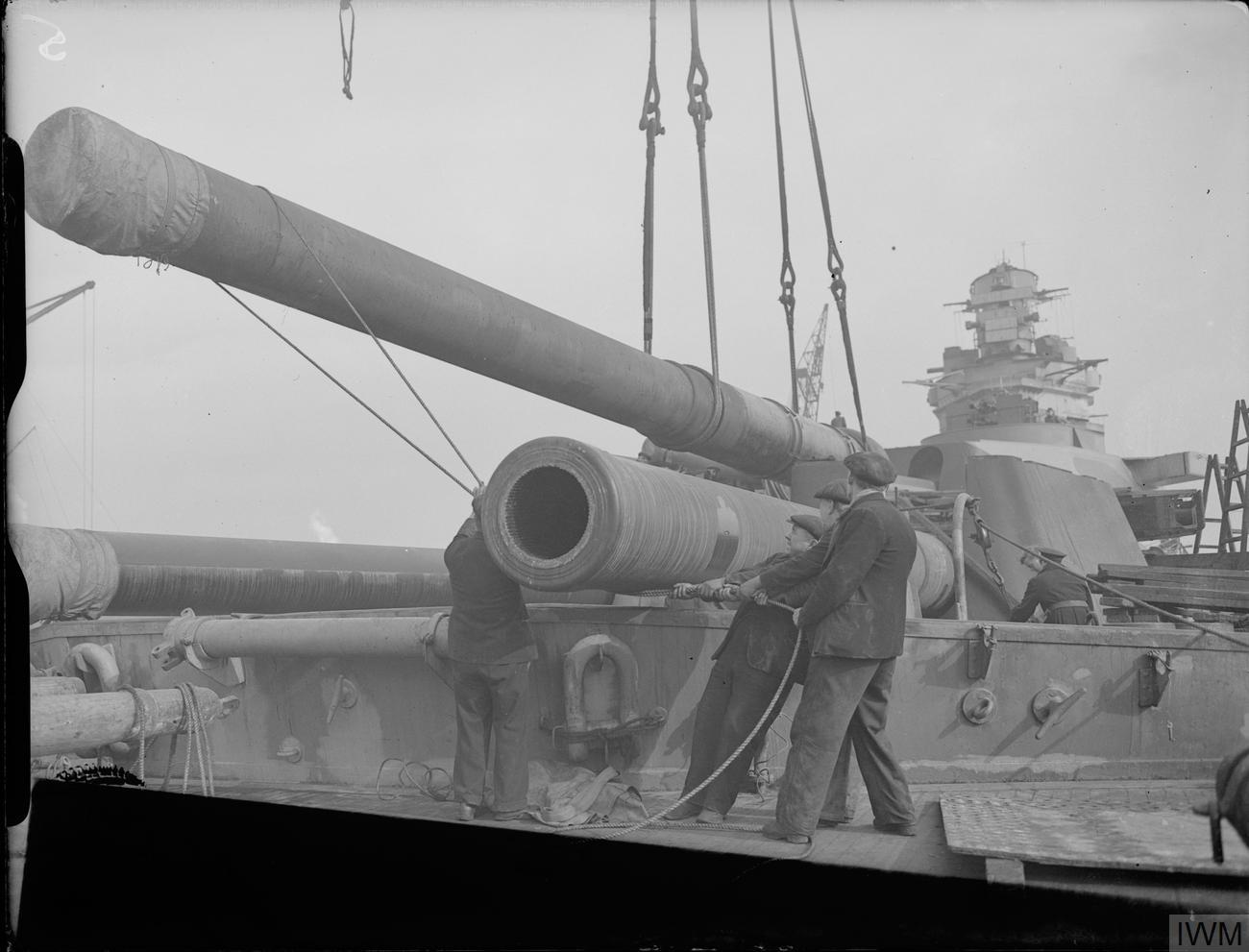
Another type of rain cover on the Duke of York
