= French cruiser Jeanne d'Arc (R97) =

Helicopter cruiser of the French Navy

Jeanne d'Arc
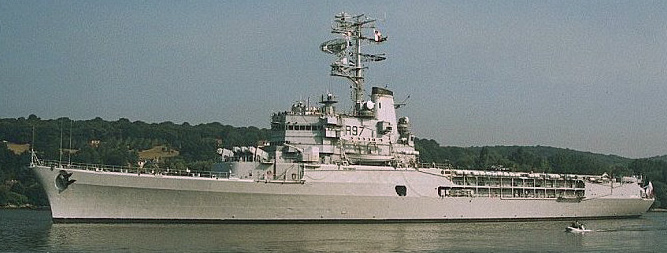
- Jeanne d'Arc sailing down the Seine, July 1999.

History

France
- Namesake: Joan of Arc
- Builder: DCAN, Arsenal de Brest
- Laid down: 1959
- Launched: 30 September 1961
- Commissioned: 1964
- Decommissioned: 1 September 2010
- Renamed: Built as La Résolue, renamed to Jeanne d'Arc in 1964
- Home port: Brest
- Identification: R 97
- Nickname(s): "La Jeanne"
- Fate: Scrapped

General characteristics
- Displacement: 10,575 tons (standard); 12,365 tons (loaded)
- Length: 182 m (597 ft)
- Beam: 24 m (79 ft)
- Draught: 7.5 m (25 ft)
- Propulsion: Four 10,000 horsepower (7.5 MW) power plants with automatic heating, 29 420 kW
- Speed: 28 knots (52 km/h; 32 mph)
- Range: 3,000 nmi (5,600 km; 3,500 mi) at 26.5 kn (49.1 km/h; 30.5 mph); 6,800 nmi (12,600 km; 7,800 mi) at 16 kn (30 km/h; 18 mph)
- Complement: 627 (total), 31 officers, 182 petty officers, 414 quartermasters and sailors, 150 cadet officers
- Sensors & processing systems: 1 DRBV 22 D; 1 DRBV51A; 2 DRBN34; 1 DRBC32A; 1 Sonar DUBV24; 1 Inmarsat
- Electronic warfare & decoys: Nixie
- Armament: 6 × Exocet-38 anti-ship missiles; 2 × 100 mm gun turrets (4 originally, two removed in 2000); 4 × 12.7mm machine guns
- Aircraft carried: 4 Super Frelon (8 in war)

Jeanne d'Arc ([ʒan daʁk]) was a helicopter cruiser of the French Navy. She was the sixth vessel of the French Navy named after Joan of Arc ("Jeanne d'Arc" in French), a national heroine of France and saint of the Catholic Church who distinguished herself in the Hundred Years' War by helping France turn the tide of the Lancastrian phase.

In peacetime, Jeanne d'Arc was used for teaching and training purposes; however, in case of emergency or crisis, she was to have become a fully capable helicopter cruiser. Toward the end of her service life, Jeanne d'Arc became unsuitable for the role due to the increasing size and weight of helicopters.

Jeanne d'Arc was built as La Résolue, as her predecessor, the Jeanne d'Arc of 1930, was still in service. She was renamed Jeanne d'Arc in 1964. The ship was retired in May 2010 and decommissioned in September 2010.

== Career ==
=== Missions ===
In peacetime, Jeanne d'Arc was a teaching and training vessel for the naval officers' application academy, and at the same time possessed an aerial group of 2 Aérospatiale Puma and 2 Aérospatiale Gazelle French Army light aviation helicopters, as well as two Alouette III naval aviation helicopters.

Jeanne d'Arc was capable of combat deployment, either in an anti-submarine warfare role with 8 WG 13 Lynx helicopters, or for external missions by carrying Puma or Gazelle light aviation French Army helicopters. Initially, she was also able to carry landing troops and Sikorsky or Super Frelon helicopters.

Jeanne d'Arc could carry roughly 10 light or heavy helicopters and simultaneously handle the takeoff and landing of 3 helicopters.

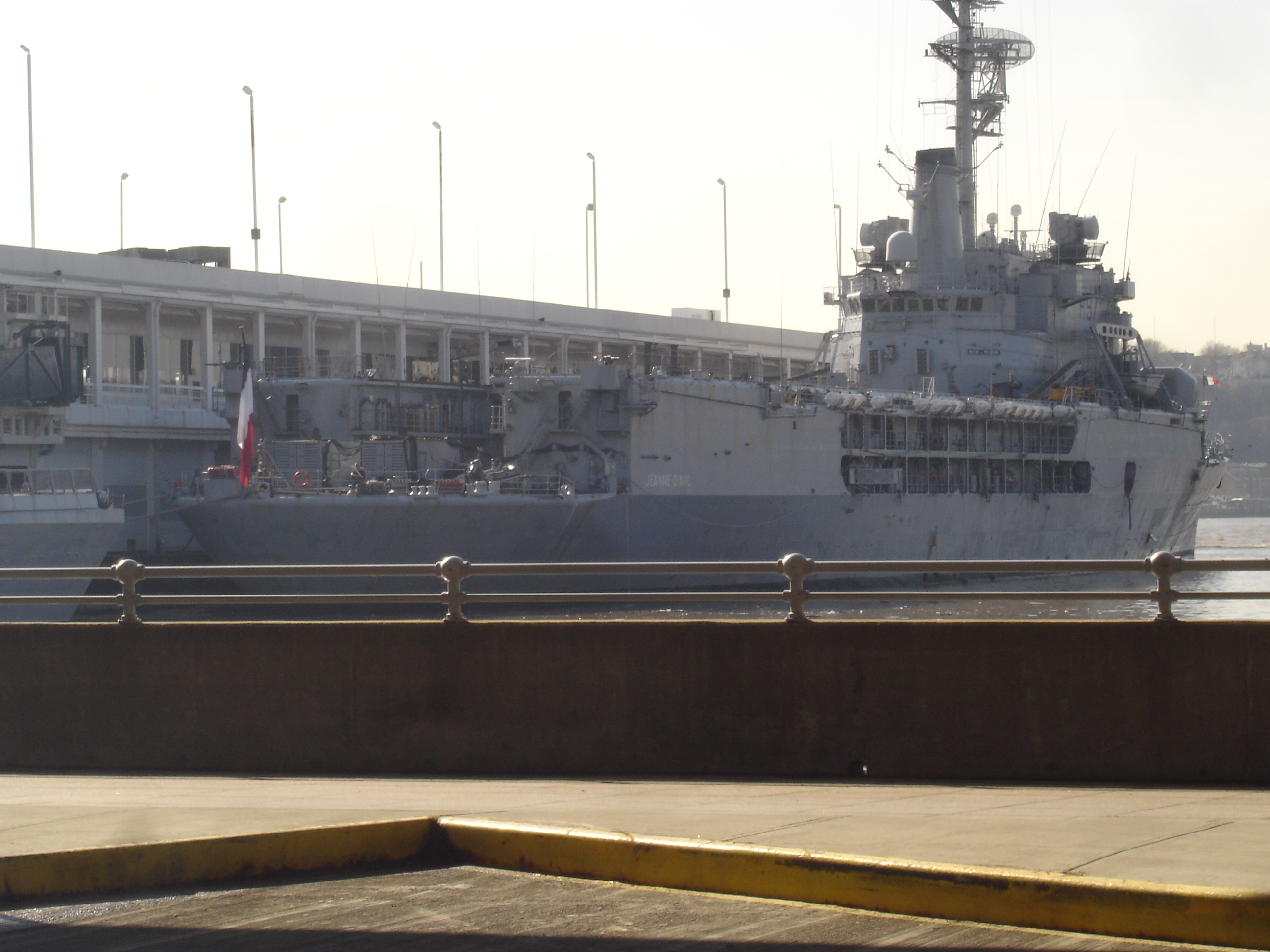
Jeanne d'Arc while performing its last cruise, docked in New York City.

Following the development of the Exocet anti-ship missile, Jeanne d'Arc was fitted with the system in 1974.

In 2008, Jeanne d'Arc was deployed in an anti-piracy role in the Gulf of Aden. The ship was used as part of the rescue effort of Le Ponant during the April 2008 hostage-taking incident. A Gazelle helicopter from Jeanne d'Arc carrying snipers chased and captured pirates who had escaped on 4x4 vehicles after the hostages had been freed.

Jeanne d'Arc commenced her final cruise in December 2009. The last trip included visits to Africa, South America including Rio and Buenos Aires, Lima, the French Antilles, the United States including New York City, and Canada. The deployment was completed in May 2010 with a return to the port of Brest, France on 27 May 2010. On its final mission, Jeanne d'Arc continued to perform its role as a training vessel for French navy midshipmen. On her final voyage, she was accompanied by the frigate Courbet (F712), and carried a French training squadron with 103 cadets, including twelve from nine foreign countries.

=== End of service formalities ===
The Jeanne d'Arc helicopter cruiser was formally removed from active service in the French Marine Nationale on 7 June 2010. The necessary disarmament operations were formalised by decree of the Ministry of Defence on 4 June 2010 and announced in the Official Bulletin of the Marine Nationale, Edition No. 26, on 25 June 2010. The announcement stated that these disarmament procedures where to be conducted under the authority of the Admiral commanding the Naval Action Force (ALFAN), the Minister of Defence and the Deputy Chief of Staff, Support and Finance", Hubert Sciorella.

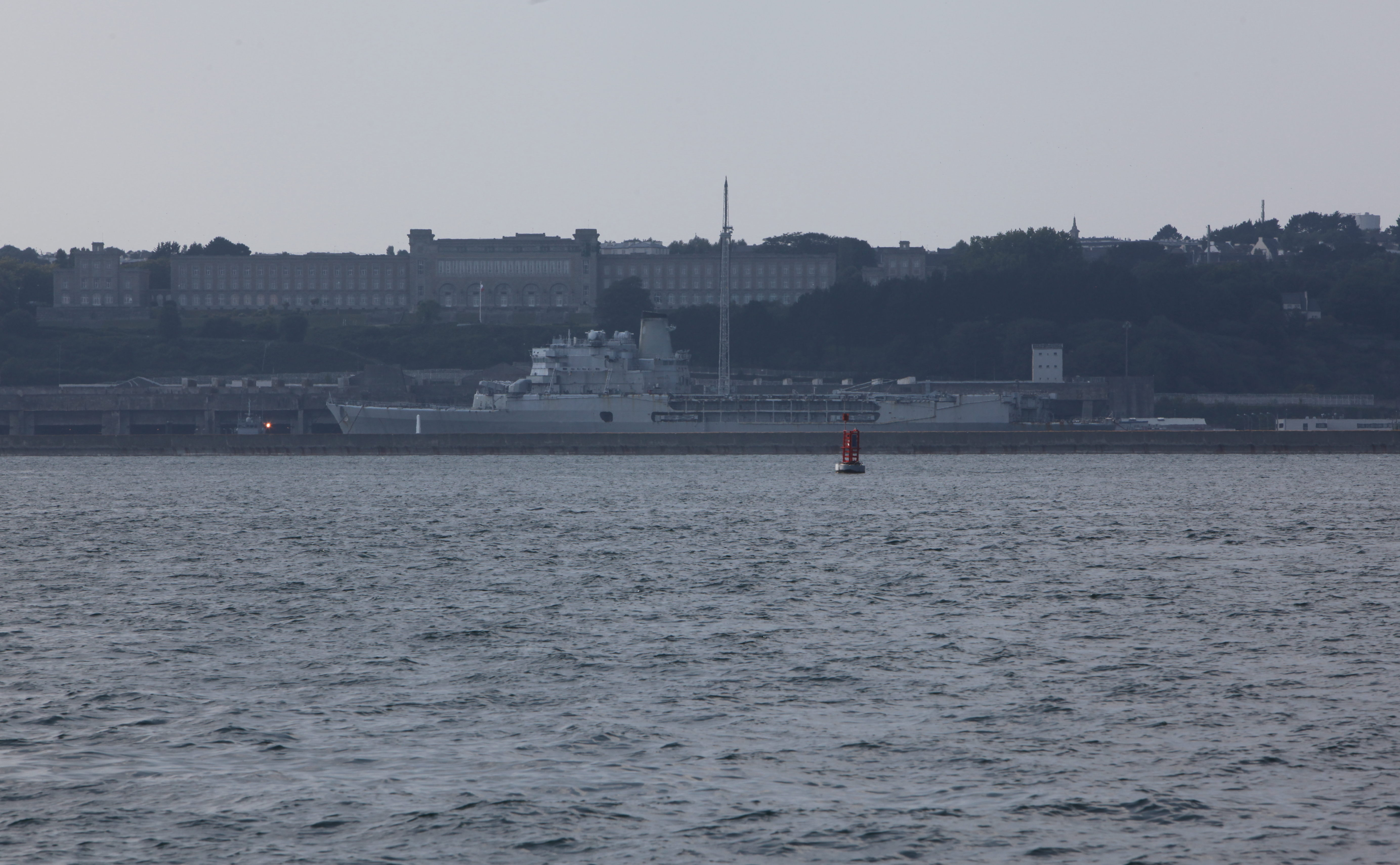
Hull Q 860, formerly Jeanne d'Arc, moored in Brest under the École de maistrance

On 1 September 2010, at 11:30, Jeanne d'Arc's colours and name were withdrawn, formally ending her life as a ship in the Marine Nationale. This final colour ceremony on Jeanne d'Arc was held in the ship's home port of Brest. Following disarmament in the Arsenal basin there, the ship continued to be moored at the Brest naval base. On 9 September 2010, the former Jeanne d'Arc has her naval number R 97 removed and was moved to Piriouas as Hull Q 860 to undergo the work of securing the hulk and extracting the remaining recoverable hardware. The task of establishing an inventory of hazardous materials present on the vessel took place in the naval yards prior to dismantling the hull and was expected to take up to two years. A tender was then sent for her dismantling. At the time, the French Navy had 76 hulks ready to be dismantled. The issue was a sensitive one, following problems arising from the disposal and dismantling of the former Clemenceau. In 2014, it was decided that Jeanne d'Arc would be dismantled at Bordeaux by the Bartin Recycling Group and Pétrofer, subsidiaries of Veolia Group. The contract was worth approximately 11.5 million Euros.

== Gallery ==
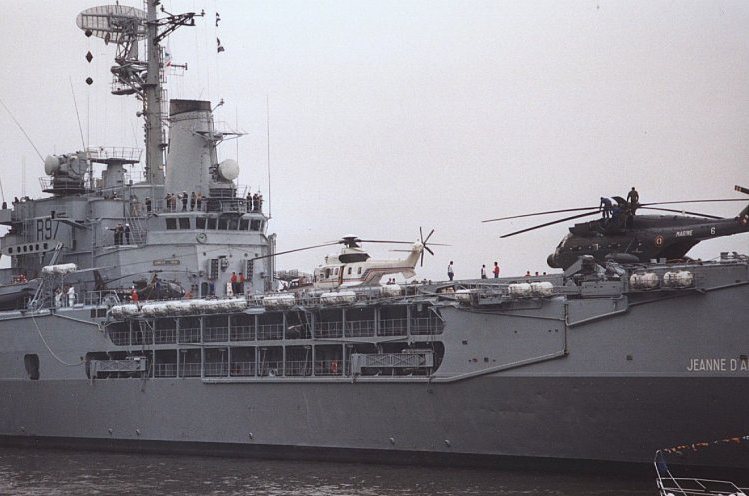
A Super Frelon on the landing deck of the Jeanne d'Arc

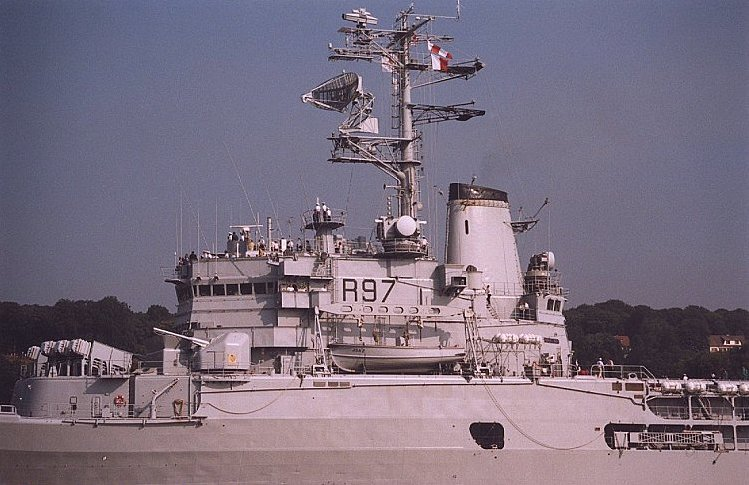
Close-up of the turret; the Exocet launchers, 100mm turret and boats are visible

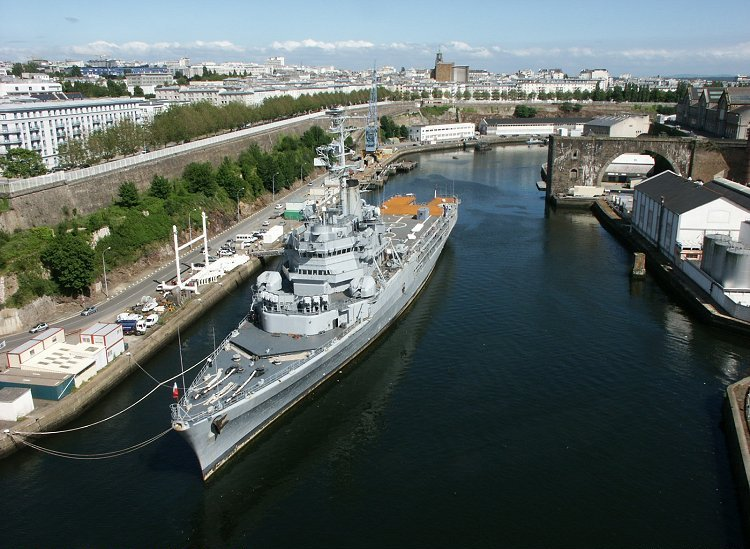
The helicopter carrier Jeanne d'Arc docked in Brest, February 2010

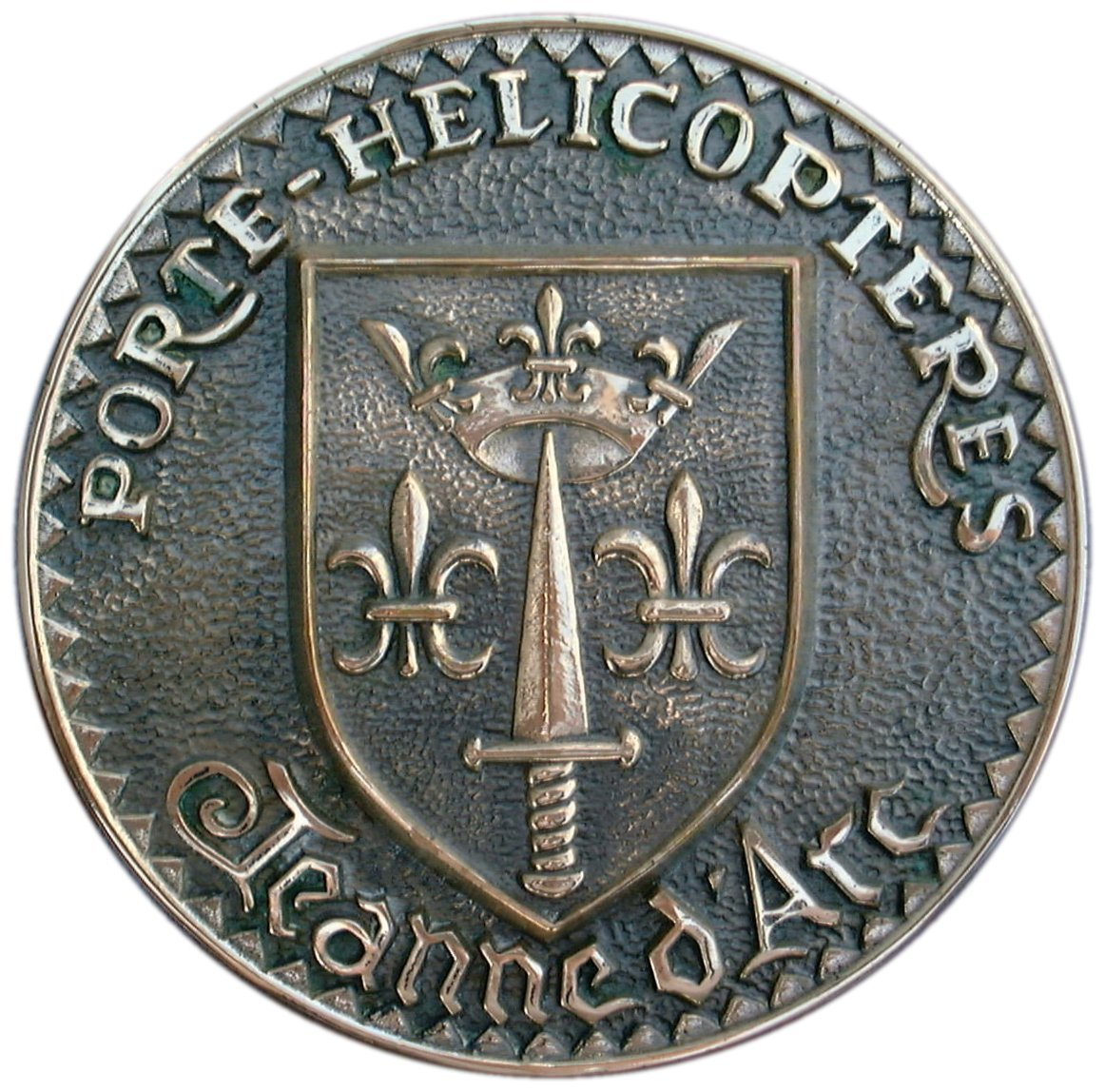
Tampion of the Jeanne d'Arc

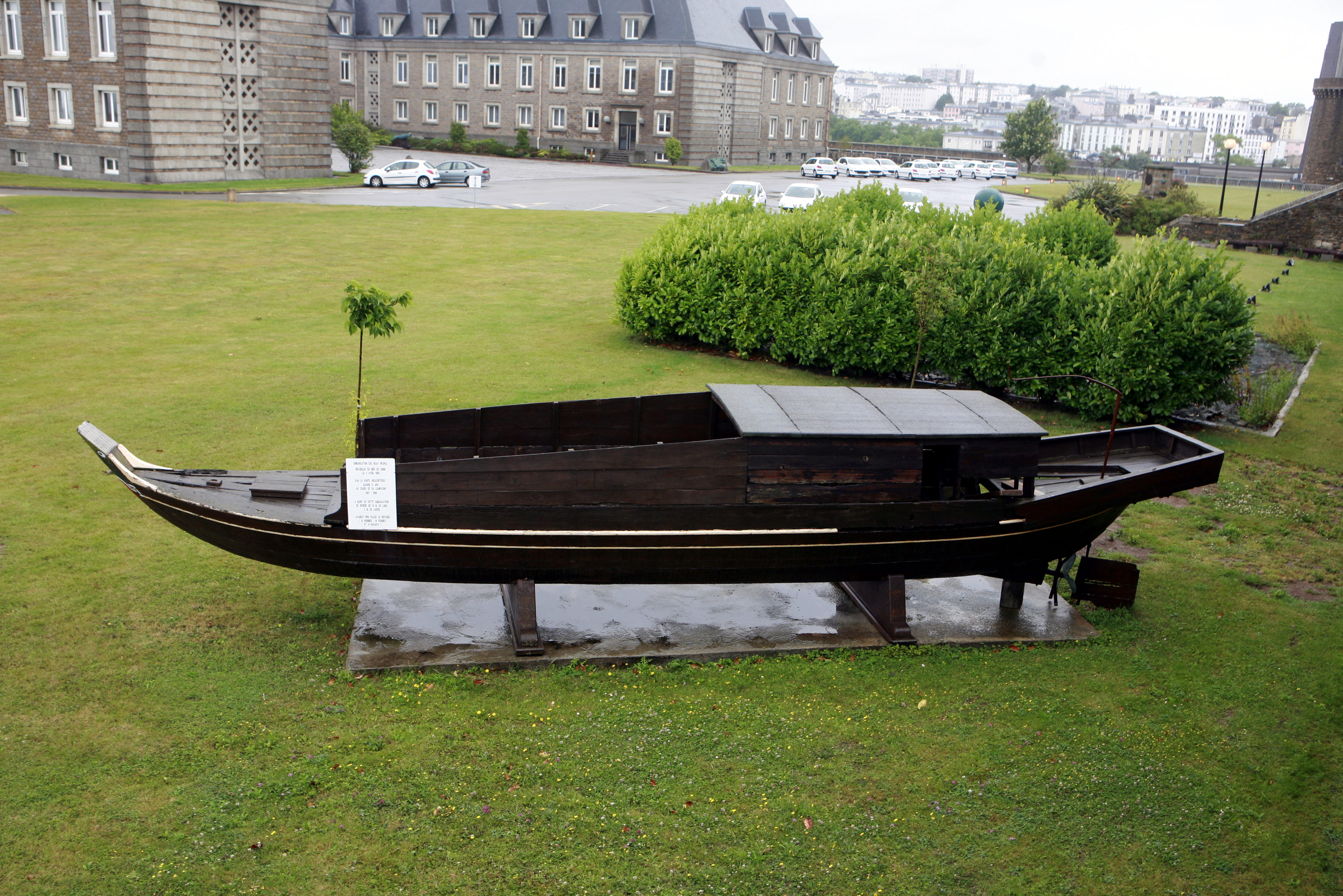
Boat rescued by the Jeanne d'Arc on 4 April 1968, with over 40 people aboard.

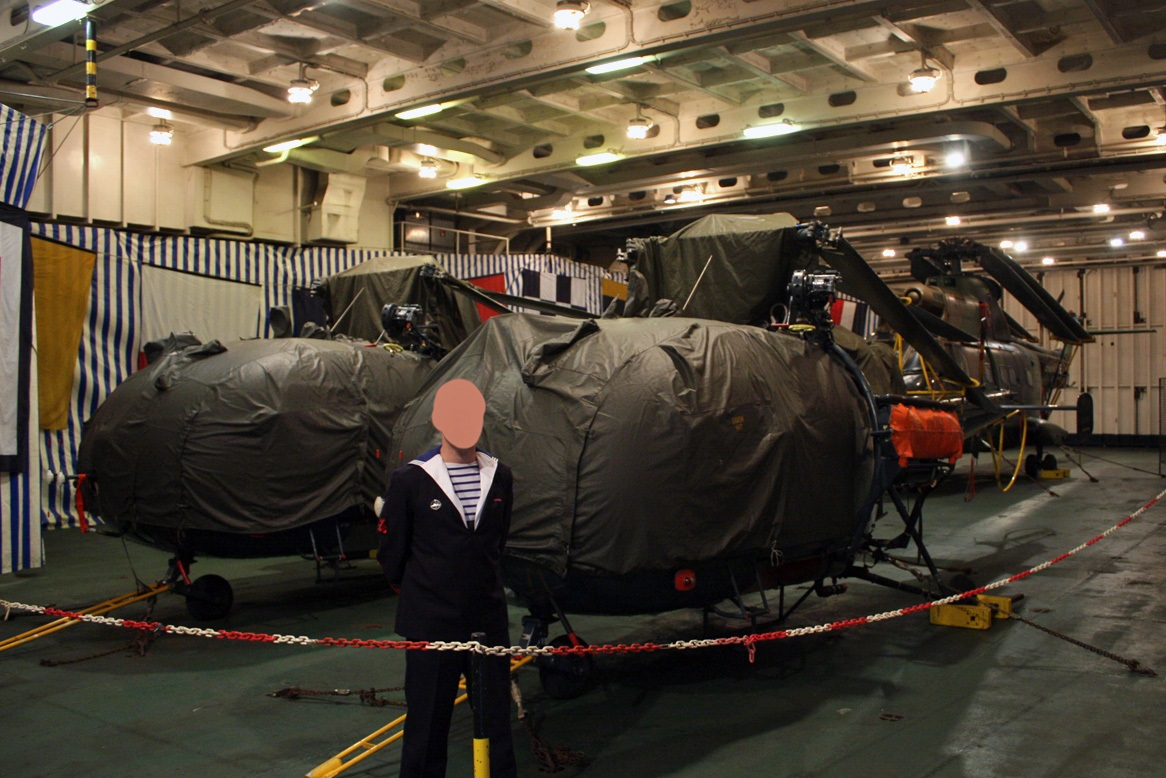
Hangar of the Jeanne d’Arc with Aérospatiale Alouette III at Harbour Birthday Hamburg in 2010

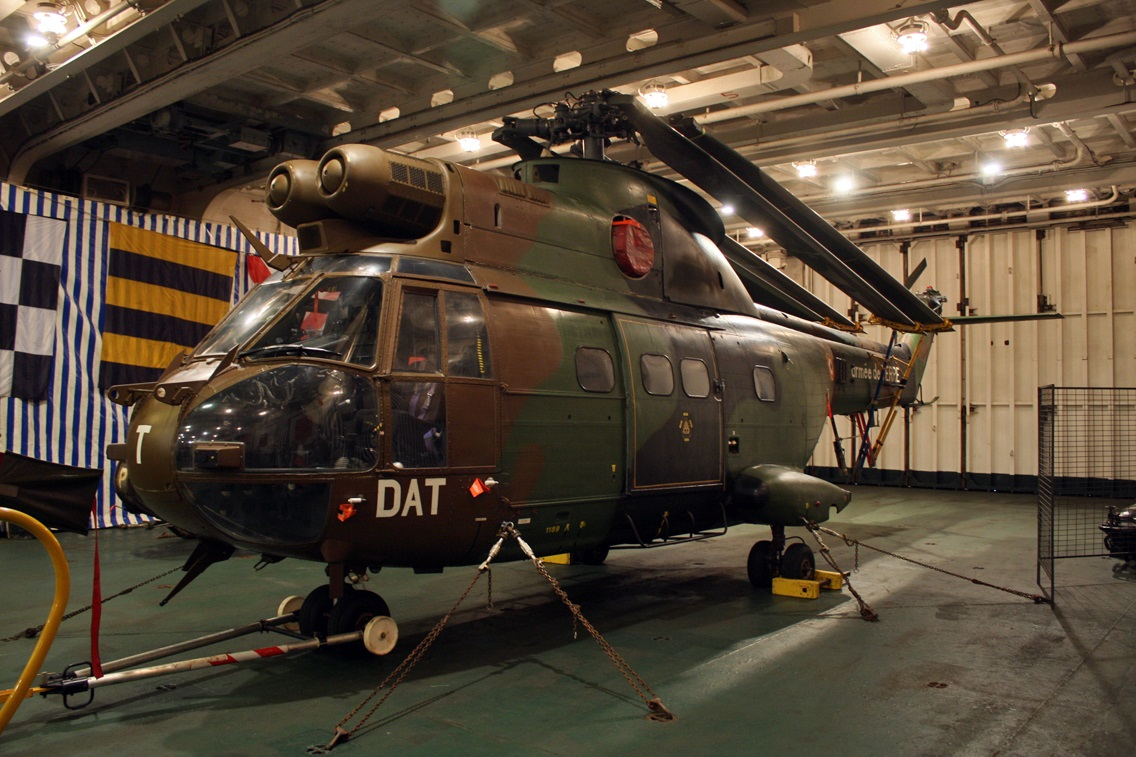
Hangar of the Jeanne d’Arc with Aérospatiale Puma at Harbour Birthday Hamburg in 2010

== See also ==
- List of cruisers

Equivalent helicopter carriers of the same era

- Vittorio Veneto class
- Haruna class
- Moskva class
