= Aircraft cruiser =

Type of warship

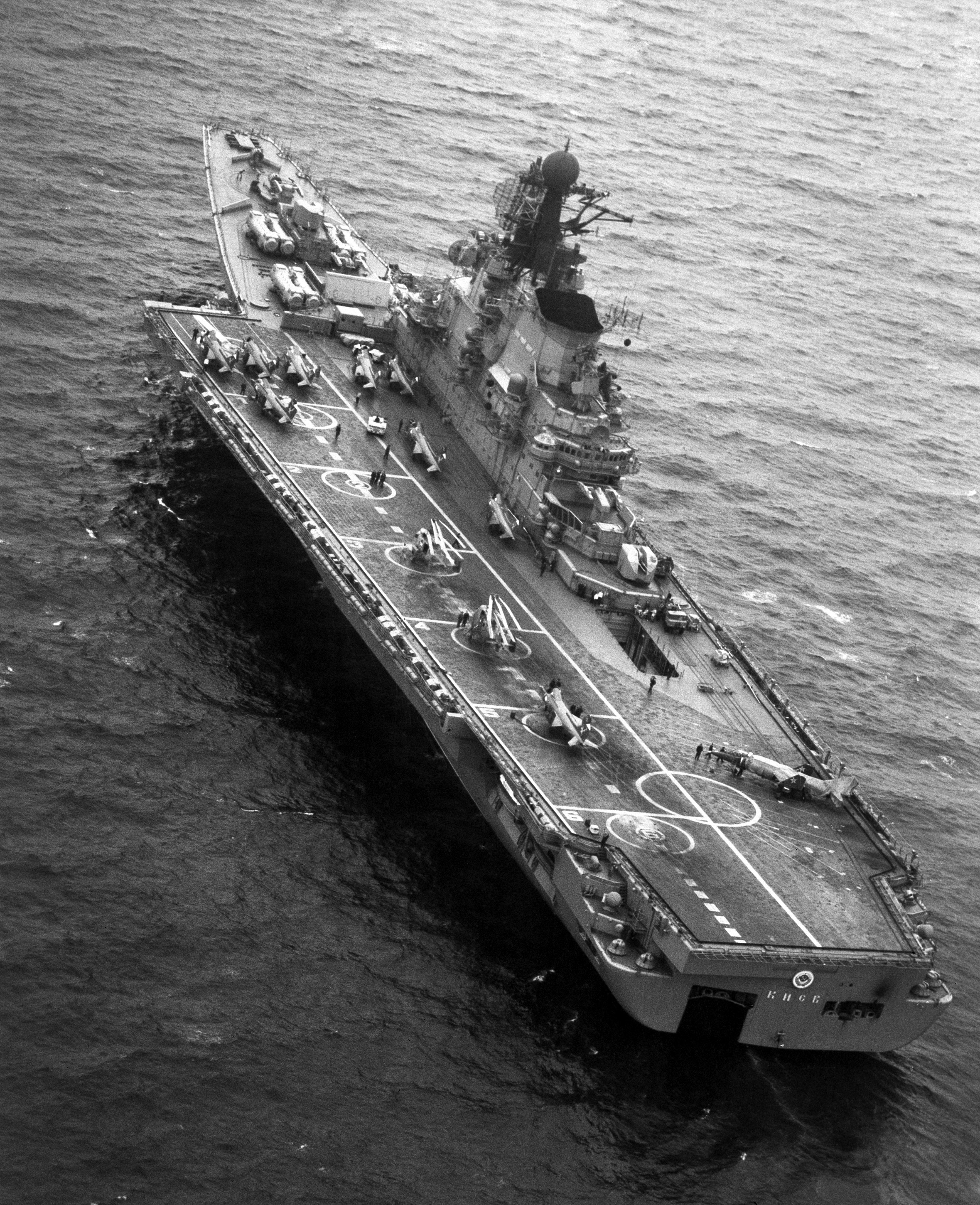
Heavy aviation cruiser Kiev, USSR, 1985.

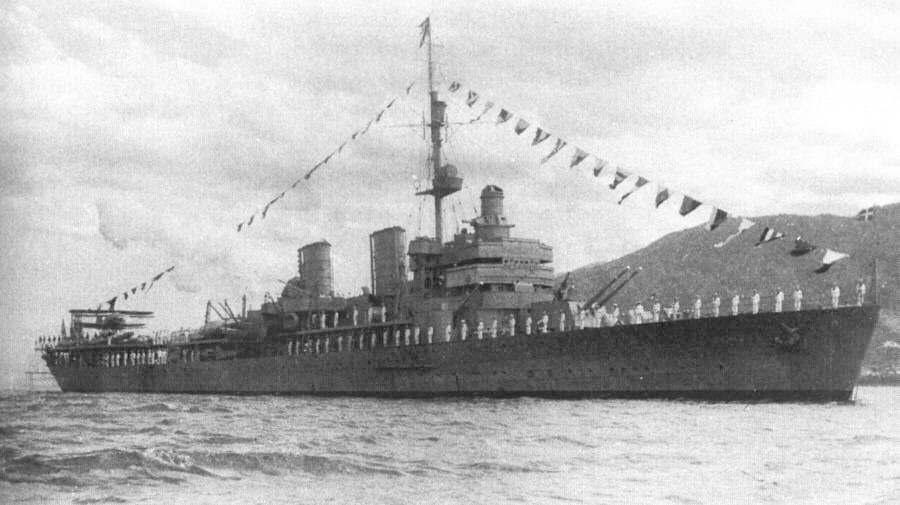
HSwMS Gotland

An aircraft cruiser, also known as aviation cruiser (Note: Ukrainian: авіаносний крейсер, romanized: avianosnyj krejser. Russian: авианесущий крейсер, romanized: avianesushchij krejser.) or cruiser-carrier, is a warship that combines the features of the aircraft carrier and a surface warship such as a cruiser or battleship.

== Early types ==
The first aircraft cruiser was originally a 1930s experimental concept of creating an all-around warship. The early aircraft cruisers were usually armed with relatively heavy artillery, mines and a number of aircraft fitted with floats (making the ship a kind of seaplane tender/fighter catapult ship). The early aircraft cruiser turned out to be an unsuccessful design. The rapid development of naval aircraft in the 1930s quickly rendered the vessels obsolete, and they were rebuilt e.g. as anti-aircraft cruisers.

A United States design for a flight deck cruiser from 1930, was described as "a Brooklyn-class light cruiser forwards [and] one half of a Wasp-class aircraft carrier aft". Although not built, similar ships were created during and after World War II as reconstructions and later from the keel up.

The Japanese built a pair of aircraft cruisers in 1937, the Tone-class cruisers. These ships had their main armament of 4x twin 8" gun turrets placed forward of the superstructure, and an aircraft handling deck was built aft of the funnel. The ships could carry a maximum of 8 float planes, launched by catapult, though the normal complement was 6. During World War II, in part to offset the loss of carriers at the Battle of Midway, Japan rebuilt its Ise-class battleships as hybrid carriers, placing the flight deck and hangar aft to replace the rear turrets, while retaining their main guns forward and amidships. The cruiser Mogami also had its rear gun turrets (which had been damaged at Midway) replaced by aircraft handling facilities. The German Kriegsmarine also studied several "Flugdeckkreuzer" (flight deck cruiser) designs in 1942 which included 20.3 cm (8 inch) or 28 cm (11 inch) gun turrets forward of the flight deck.

== Helicopter cruisers ==
A newer variation of the aircraft carrier is the helicopter carrier, which is capable of operating at least 4 or more helicopters, including medium and heavy lift models. This is in contrast to surface warships such as cruisers, destroyers, and frigates which have basic aviation facilities, including a hangar and landing pad, that are sufficient only for 1–2 light/medium helicopters.

Post-war the United Kingdom reconstructed the Tiger-class cruisers HMS Blake and HMS Tiger into helicopter cruisers, retaining their guns forward but having their aft guns removed for the installation of a hangar and helicopter platform for the operation of four Sea King helicopters.

The Italian Andrea Doria-class cruisers and Vittorio Veneto, French Jeanne d'Arc and Soviet Moskva-class helicopter cruisers were built from the keel up as guided missile cruisers forward and helicopter carriers aft.

USS Hayler and her unnamed sister ship (which was never funded) were originally planned as modified Spruance-class destroyers, to be built as helicopter destroyers (DDH), provided they would not cost more than a standard Spruance class. Litton-Ingalls completed sketch design work for Hayler, which moved the helicopter deck aft, stretching the length of the hangar and displacing the Sea Sparrow launcher to the top of the hangar. The design would have accommodated two SH-3 Sea Kings or four smaller SH-60 Seahawk or SH-2 Seasprite helicopters. While the prospective Hayler probably would not have cost much more to build than a standard Spruance class, the detail design and engineering work required before the ship could be built would have been substantial (similar work for the Kidd class cost $110.8 million). This raised the cost of the DDH substantially above a standard Spruance-class destroyer. While this additional cost might have been justified if the DDH was going to enter series production, it was difficult to justify for a single ship. Accordingly, the Navy built Hayler to the same design as the rest of the Spruance class.

== Interdiction Assault Ship ==
In 1980, there was a proposed “Interdiction Assault Ship” (IAS) conversion for the Iowa-class battleships that would have removed the aft main gun turret. This would free up space for a V-shaped ramped flight deck (the base of the V would have been on the ship's stern, while each leg of the V would extend forward, so that planes taking off would fly past the ship's exhaust stacks and conning tower), while a new hangar would be added with 2 elevators, which would support up to 12 Boeing AV-8B Harrier II jump-jets. These aviation facilities could also support helicopters, SEAL teams and up to 500 Marines for an air assault. In the empty space between the V flight deck would be up to 320 missile silos accommodating a mixture of Tomahawk land attack missiles, ASROC anti-submarine rockets and Standard surface-to-air missiles. The existing 5-inch gun turrets would be replaced with 155-millimeter howitzers for naval gunfire support. These modifications would have required significant time and funding to achieve so they were never carried out, furthermore the Department of Defense and the Navy wanted the Iowa battleships reactivated as quickly as possible.

== Aviation cruisers built in the Soviet Union ==
In the Russian Navy, "aviation cruiser" is a designation for the Kiev and Kuznetsov-class ships. They are a cross between a cruiser and an aircraft carrier. Aviation cruisers have close-in weapon systems, both gun and missile, for self-defense against missiles or rockets. Unlike aircraft carriers who rely solely upon their aircraft and helicopter complement for offensive power, aviation cruisers are also equipped with cruiser weaponry to engage the full gamut of surface, submarines and aircraft adversaries.

The Kiev class of aviation cruisers is capable of carrying VTOL aircraft and helicopters. The ships have only a single angled flight deck for aviation. The forward deck is used to carry cruiser weapons, including P-500 Bazalt cruise missiles that are the main armament of the Slava-class cruiser.

The Kuznetsov class is classified as heavy aviation cruisers, reflecting their greater weight as well as the larger number of aircraft they can operate. In addition to helicopters, they are also capable of operating conventional fixed-wing aircraft like the Sukhoi Su-33 and the Mikoyan MiG-29K. The ships have an angled flight deck as well as an axial flight deck for takeoff. Since there is no catapult, a bow ski jump is used to assist takeoff. Kuznetsov also carries the P-700 Granit cruise missiles that form the main armament of the Kirov-class battlecruiser.

All Soviet aircraft carriers were built at the Black Sea Shipyard in Mykolaiv (Russian: Nikolayev) in the Ukrainian SSR. Their classification as aircraft cruisers is very important for the purposes of international law, as it allows them to transit the Turkish Straits on their way into the Mediterranean Sea. Under the Montreux Convention, aircraft carriers heavier than 15,000 tons may not pass through the Straits. However, there is no tonnage limit on capital ships operated by Black Sea Powers. Turkey has always allowed Soviet and Russian aviation cruisers to transit the Straits, and no other signatory to the Montreux Convention has challenged the ships' classification.

== Cruisers in name only ==
Some aircraft-carrying ships have been officially designated as cruisers, despite being for all intents and purposes light aircraft carriers. The Royal Navy's Invincible-class aircraft carriers were originally termed "through-deck cruisers" for political reasons (the CVA-01 project had recently been cancelled). In addition, they were expected to serve in some cruiser-like roles – taking on those roles from the RN's Tiger-class cruiser conversions – and were constructed in a similar fashion to cruisers. Later in their life they were however known as aircraft carriers.

== Aircraft cruisers ==
=== Early types ===
- HSwMS Gotland
- Japanese cruiser Mogami
- Ise-class battleship
- Tone-class cruiser (fully functional heavy cruisers, but incorporated a heavy seaplane element for scouting purposes)
- Japanese cruiser Ōyodo (built as an aircraft cruiser but never operated as such)

=== Later types ===
- Kiev-class aircraft carrier
- Giuseppe Garibaldi-class aircraft carrier
- Kuznetsov-class aircraft carrier
- VSTOL Support Ship (proposed)
- Interdiction Assault Ship (proposed)
- Izumo-class destroyer

=== Helicopters only ===
- Andrea Doria-class cruiser
- Italian cruiser Vittorio Veneto
- French cruiser Jeanne d'Arc
- Moskva-class helicopter carrier
- Haruna-class destroyer
- Shirane-class destroyer
- Hyūga-class helicopter destroyer

== See also ==
- Aviation-capable naval vessels
- Battlecarrier
- CAM ship
- Fighter catapult ship
- Merchant aircraft carrier
- Seaplane tender

== Bibliography ==
- Bonner, Kermit (1997). Final Voyages. Paducah, KY: Turner Publishing. ISBN 978-1-56311-289-8.
- Friedman, Norman (1983). U.S. Aircraft Carriers: An Illustrated Design History. Annapolis, MD: United States Naval Institute Press. ISBN 978-0-87021-739-5.
