= Battlecarrier =

Conceptual aircraft carrier-battleship hybrid

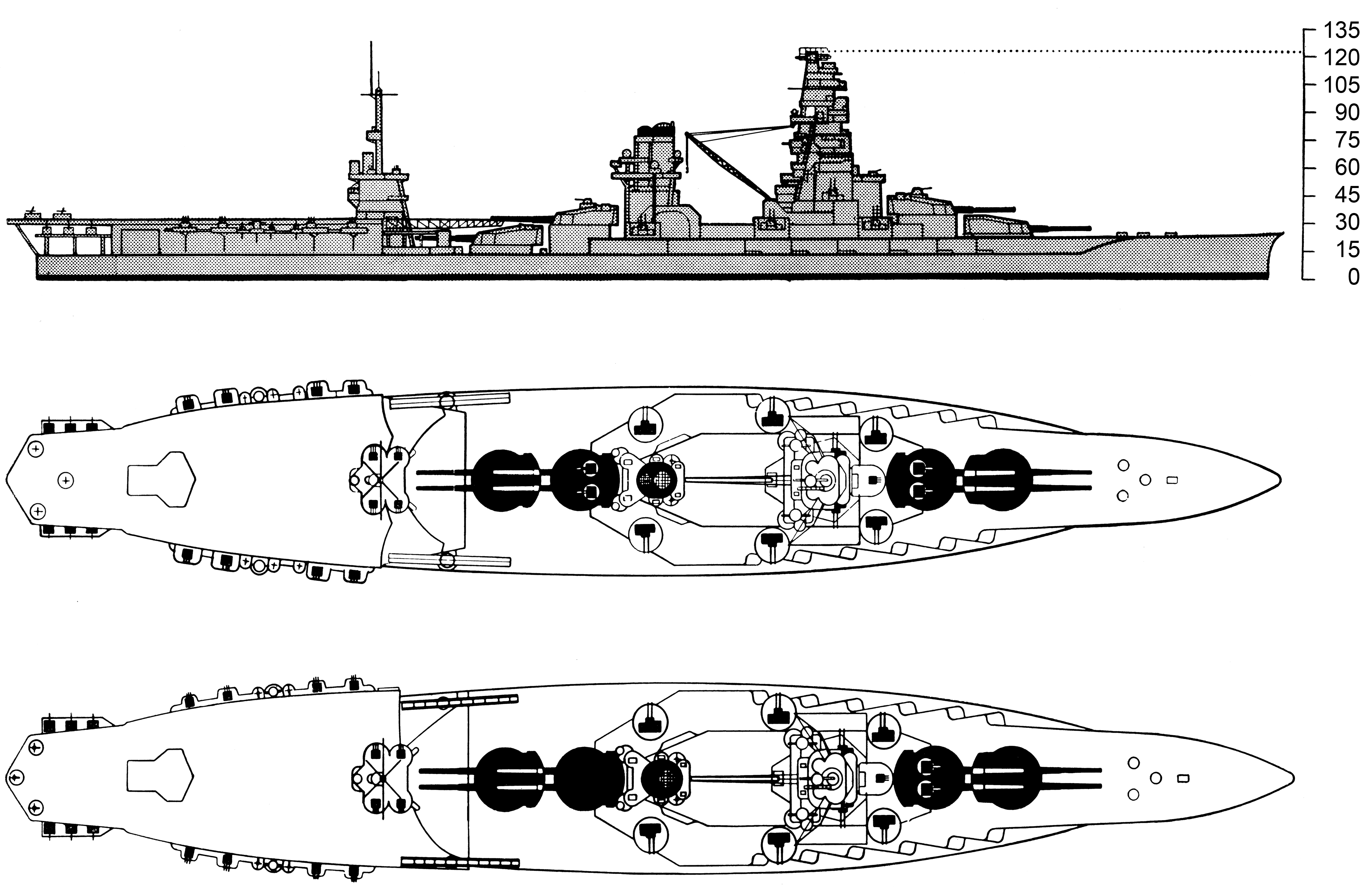
Top: A scale model showing the rear flight deck and forward 16-inch guns of the proposed Interdiction Assault Ship
Bottom: A late-war American drawing of the Ise class, showing variations in the reported configuration of the catapults

The term battlecarrier (less commonly battle carrier or battle-carrier) primarily refers to a conceptual hybrid capital ship capable of fulfilling, to some satisfactory extent, the roles of both an aircraft carrier and a large-gun warship such as a battleship or battlecruiser, but has referred to other naval concepts as well.

Since the early 1930s many plans and projects to make a battlecarrier were proposed, such a project which was close to being built was a project made by the United States and the Soviet Union, but was cancelled. Battlecarriers, theoretically, would perform poorly in battle if they were created. Their hangar and flight deck is inviting for enemy attacks and due to the same hangar, less armament can be carried, and vice versa.

== Other uses ==
- the American Midway-class aircraft carriers have been referred to as 'battlecarriers' due to their heavier armor and armament than the preceding Essex-class aircraft carrieres. The CVB hull designation has been erroneously claimed to stand for "Aircraft Carrier (Battle)", but stands for aircraft carrier, large
- the Soviet Kiev-class aircraft carrier
- the Japanese Ise-class battleships after their conversion to hybrid carriers
- various plans to modernize the American Iowa-class battleships into aircraft carriers, such as the Interdiction Assault Ship
- plans to complete the French battleship Jean Bart in USA as an aircraft carrier.

== See also ==
- Aircraft cruiser
- Helicopter destroyer
