= Timeline for aircraft carrier service =

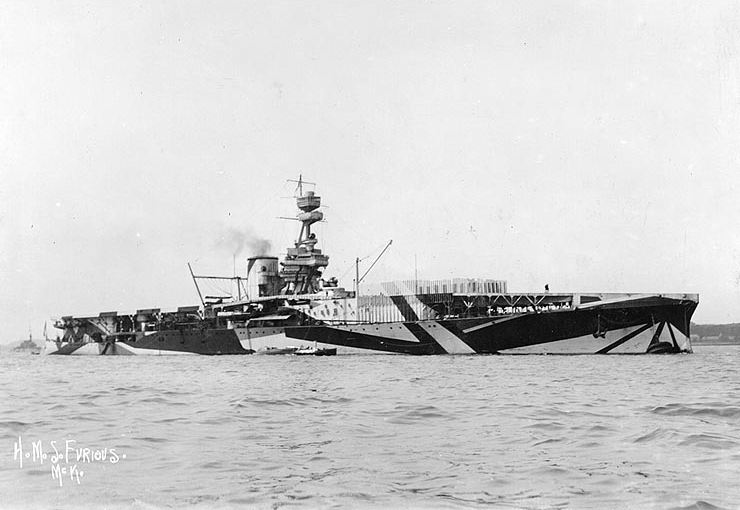
HMS Furious in 1918 – Note forward flying off deck, and original cruiser superstructure.

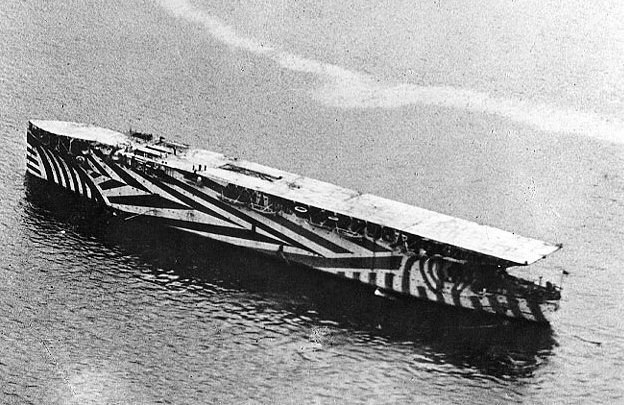
HMS Argus in 1918 – the world's first full-flight-deck aircraft carrier.

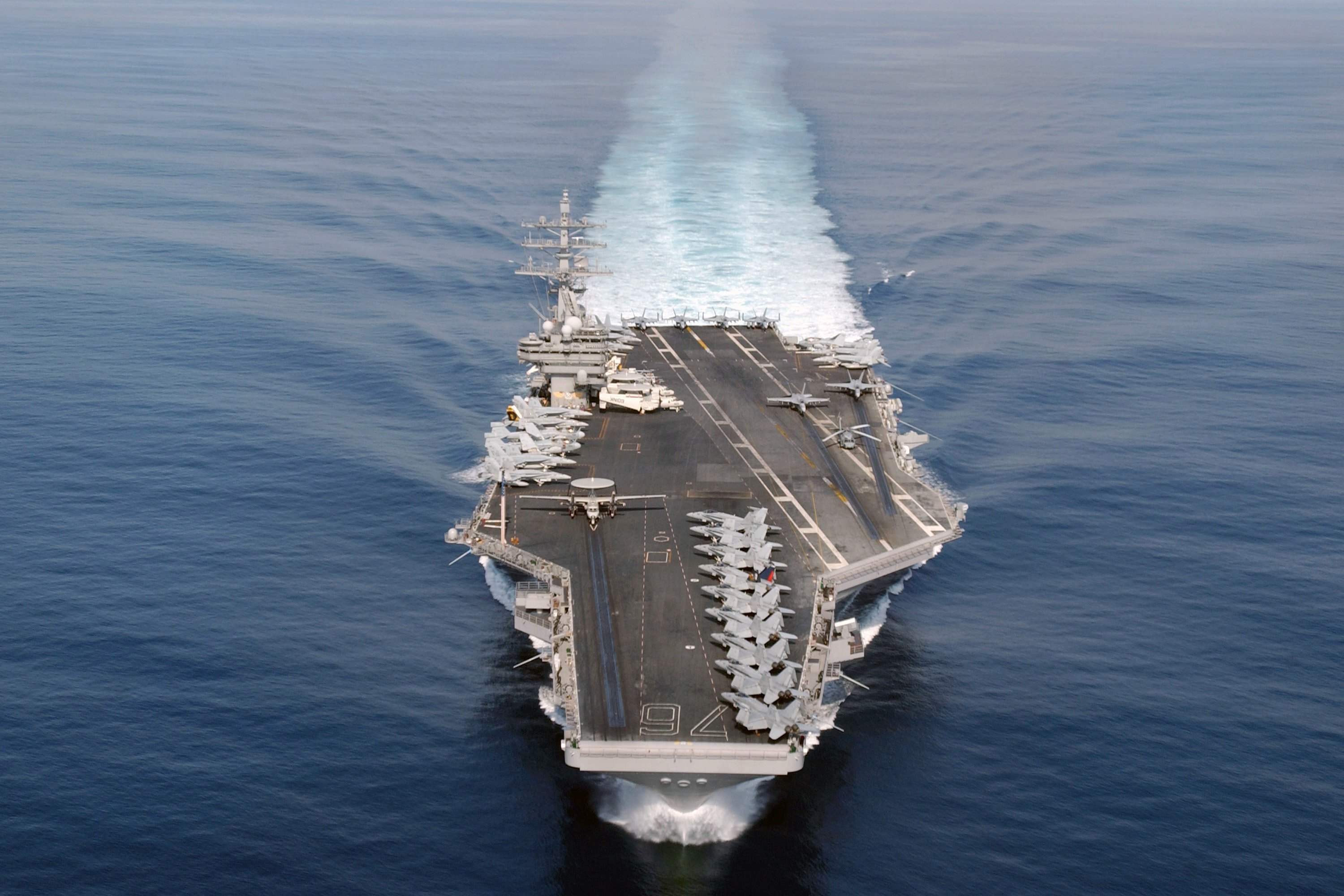
USS Ronald Reagan in 2005. In less than 100 years aircraft carriers have developed into a powerful tool for the projection of power in pursuit of national interests.

Aircraft carriers have their origins during the days of World War I. The earliest experiments consisted of fitting temporary "flying off" platforms to the gun turrets of the warships of several nations, notably the United States and the United Kingdom. The first ship to be modified with a permanent flight deck was the battlecruiser HMS Furious, which initially had a single flying-off deck forward of the original superstructure. Subsequently, she was modified with a separate "landing on" deck aft and later with a full flush deck. Other ships, often liners, were modified to have full flush flight decks, HMS Argus being the first to have such modification begun. Those first faltering steps gave little indication of just how important the aircraft carrier was to prove to be. During the inter-war years (between the World Wars), Japan, the United Kingdom and the United States built up significant carrier fleets so that by the beginning of World War II, they had 18 carriers between them. The 1940 Battle of Taranto and 1941 Attack on Pearl Harbor in retrospect showed the world that the aircraft carrier was to be the most important ship in the modern fleet. Today, aircraft carriers are the capital ships of the navies they serve in, and in the case of modern US "supercarriers", they embark an air group that is effectively a small air force.

This timeline is an attempt to provide a unified chronology of key dates^{[I]} in carrier service. Aircraft carriers^{[II]} often serve their navies for many decades and this chronology^{[III]} enables the reader to track the progress of the carrier as it has developed alongside the evolution of aircraft for nearly a hundred years.

== Pre-carrier history ==
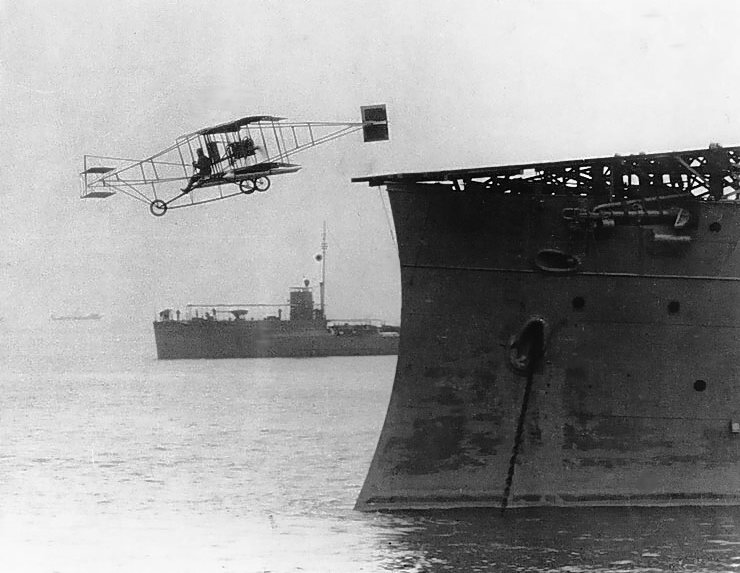
Civilian pilot Eugene Ely takes off in a Curtiss Model D biplane from USS Birmingham

1849

- On 12 July 1849, the Austrian Navy ship SMS Vulcano was used for launching incendiary balloons. A number of small Montgolfiere hot air ballons were launched with the intention of dropping bombs on Venice. Although the attempt largely failed due to contrary winds which drove the balloons back over the ship, one bomb did land on the city.

1907

- The British Admiralty, according to legend, politely refused the Wright brothers' offer to sell them one or more aircraft, by saying that they could see no place for aviation in naval circles.^{[IV]}

1910

- 14 November – First successful launch of an aircraft from a ship, using a temporary wooden platform for a flight deck on the stationary cruiser USS Birmingham.

1911

- 18 January – First deck landing, using a temporary wooden platform on the at anchor USS Pennsylvania; first use of a tailhook-arrested landing system.

1912

- 10 January – First launch of an aircraft from a British ship, Charles Samson flies off a platform fixed to the front of the stationary battleship HMS Africa.
- 2 May – First recorded flight from a moving ship, Samson flies off HMS Hibernia, steaming at 10.5 knots. Then in June, Samson flies off HMS London.

== World War I ==
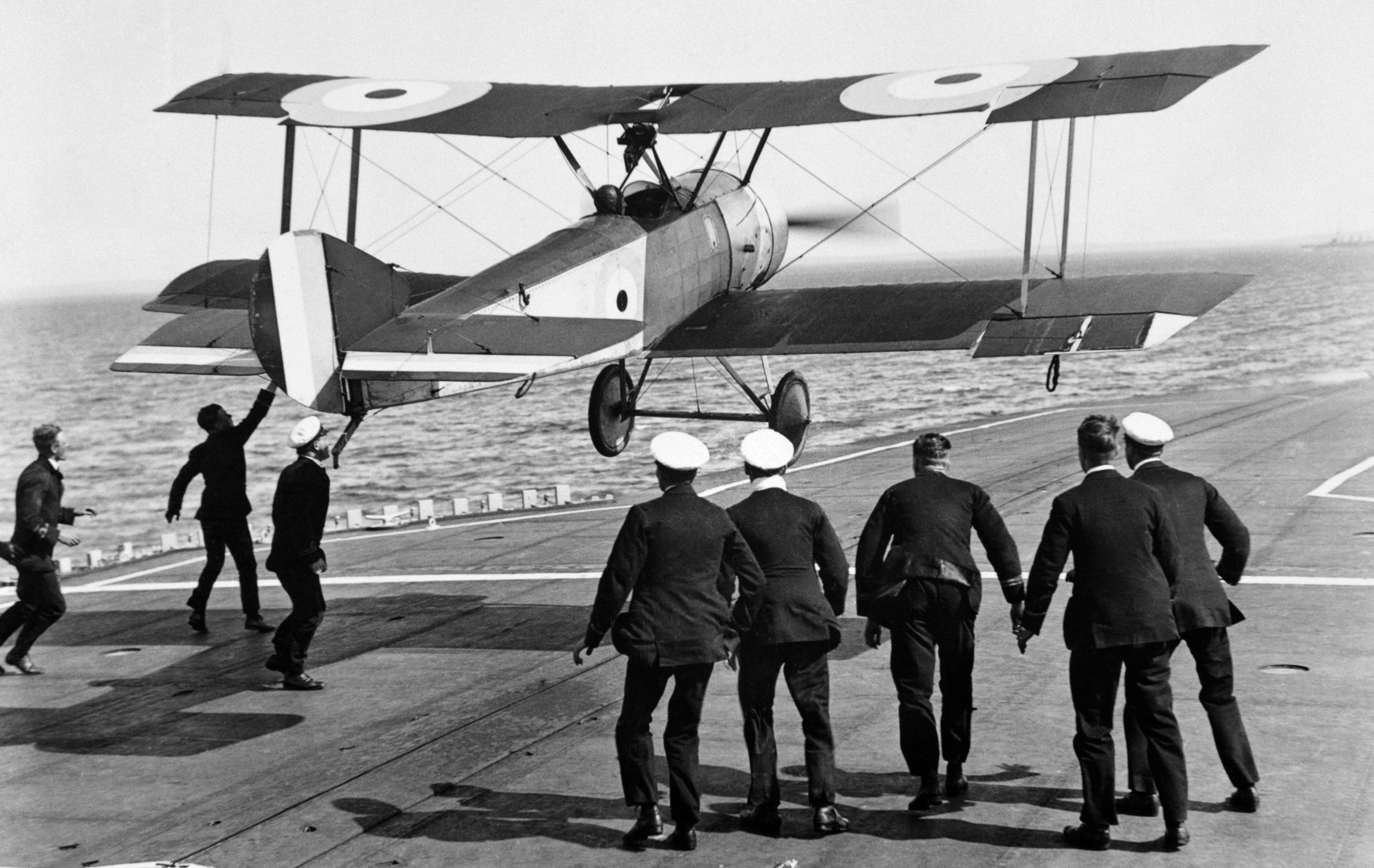
2 August 1917, Edwin Harris Dunning makes the first aircraft landing on a moving ship, HMS Furious

1914

- 31 October – First aircraft carrying ship to be sunk in action, (former cruiser) seaplane carrier HMS Hermes sunk by U-27.
- 25 December – Attack on Cuxhaven, the first attack from the sea upon a land target using aircraft (seaplanes carried to within range to bomb the Zeppelin sheds at Cuxhaven).

1915

- 12 August – First attack using an air-launched torpedo, from a Short Type 184 seaplane flown by Flight Commander Charles H. K. Edmonds from seaplane carrier HMS Ben-my-Chree.
- 5 November – First catapult launch of an aircraft from a ship, USS North Carolina.

1916

- 31 May – First use of an aeroplane during a battle at sea, the Battle of Jutland.
- August – Incomplete Italian liner Conte Rosso purchased by the Royal Navy for completion and conversion to an aircraft carrier, HMS Argus.

1917

- February – Incomplete large light cruiser HMS Furious has its forward gun replaced with a flying-off deck.
- 2 August – First aircraft landing aboard a moving ship, HMS Furious; this ship was subsequently modified with a stern-mounted landing deck in late 1917.
- 21 August – First air-to-air kill from a ship-launched aircraft, Zeppelin L23 shot down by a Sopwith Pup from cruiser HMS Yarmouth.
- 2 December – HMS Argus launched.

1918

- 15 January – HMS Hermes laid down; Hermes was the first ship specifically designed to be built as an aircraft carrier and the first carrier to feature an island superstructure.
- 28 February – Incomplete Chilean battleship Almirante Cochrane purchased by the Royal Navy to be completed as the carrier HMS Eagle.
- 8 June – HMS Eagle launched.
- 9 July – First strike by aircraft launched from a carrier, the Tondern raid, an attack by British aircraft from Furious against a German airship base in northern Germany.
- 14 September – HMS Argus commissioned.
- 11 November – Armistice signed, signalling the end of WWI.

== Between the wars ==
1919

- 11 July – USS Jupiter authorised to be converted to a carrier.
- 11 September – HMS Hermes launched.
- 16 December – Hōshō laid down.

=== 1920–1929 ===
1920

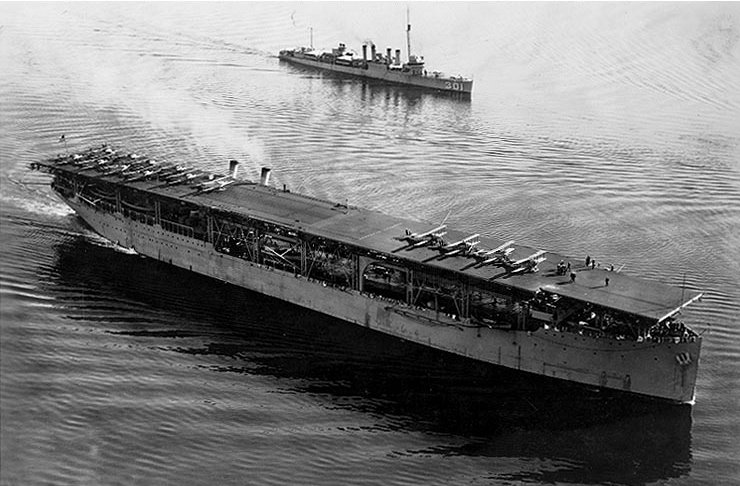
USS Langley

- 21 April – USS Jupiter renamed USS Langley.
- 1 November – U.S. Navy sinks USS Indiana during an exercise testing aerial bombardment.
- 6 December – Akagi laid down as battlecruiser.

1921

- 13 November – Hōshō launched.

1922

- 6 February – Washington Naval Treaty limiting naval forces signed.
- HMS Furious flush-deck conversion begun.
- Spanish seaplane carrier Dédalo is commissioned in the Spanish Navy.
- 20 March – USS Langley commissioned.
- 1 July – Battlecruisers USS Lexington and USS Saratoga reclassified to be completed as carriers.
- 27 December – Hōshō commissioned.

1923

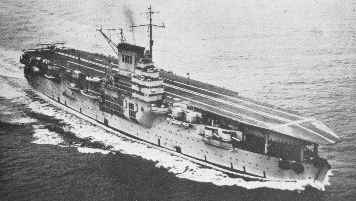
French aircraft carrier Béarn

- July – HMS Hermes commissioned
- August – Conversion of the French Normandie-class battleship Béarn to an aircraft carrier started.
- Kaga and Akagi conversions from battlecruiser to aircraft carrier begun.

1924

- 26 February – HMS Eagle commissioned.
- June – Light cruiser HMS Courageous carrier conversion started.

1925

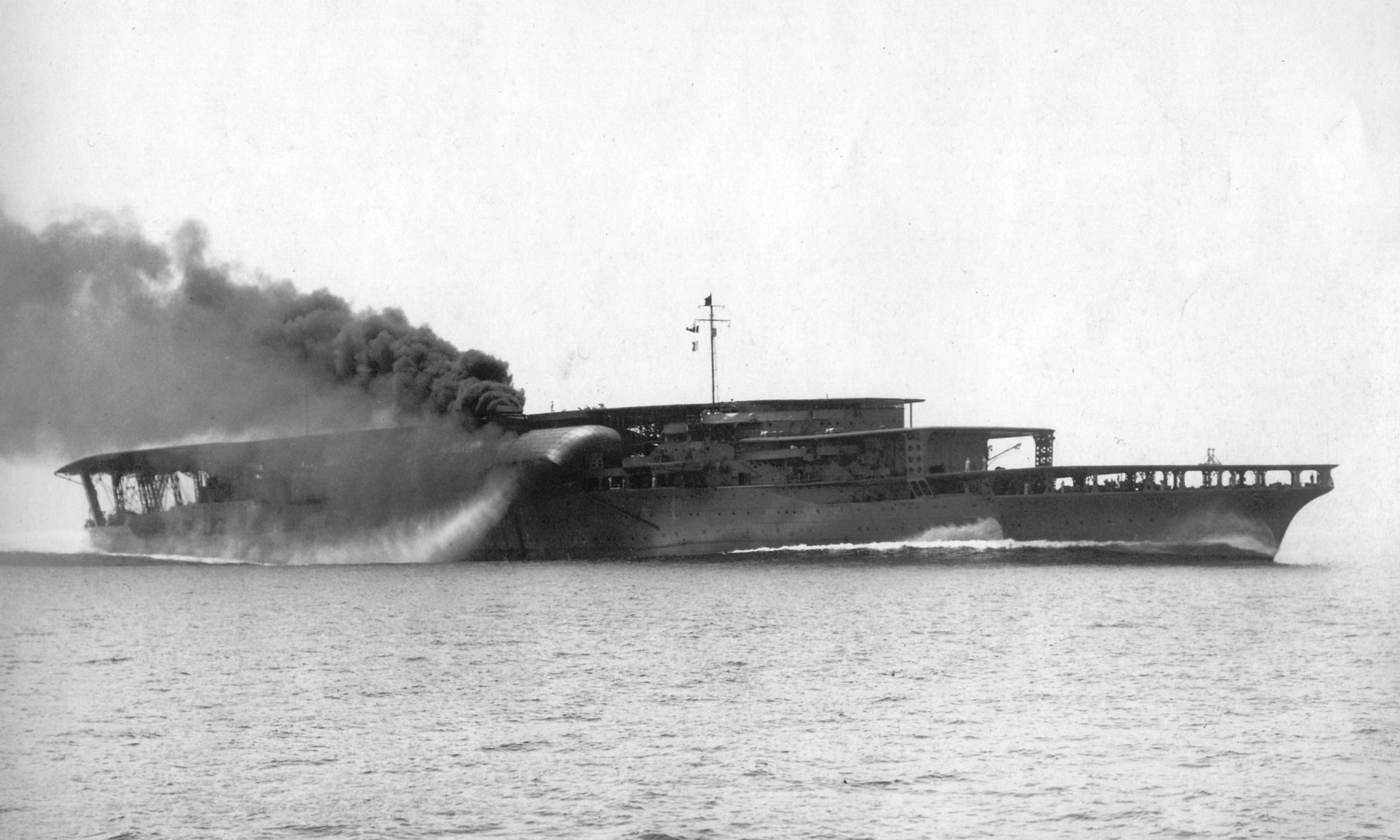
Japanese carrier Akagi

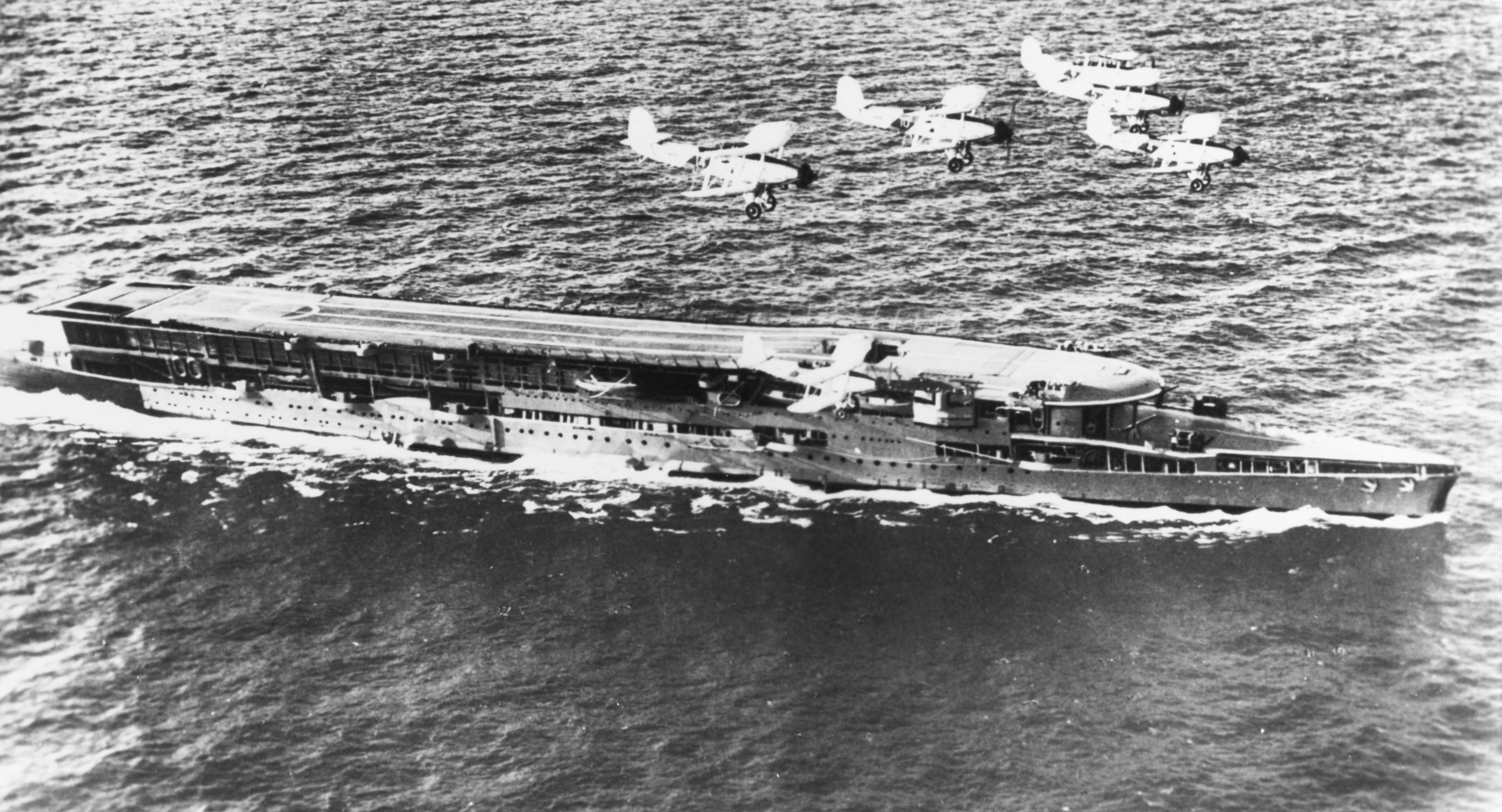
HMS Furious after flush deck conversion

- Light cruiser HMS Glorious carrier conversion started.
- 7 April – USS Saratoga launched.
- 22 April – Akagi launched.
- 1 July – First night deck landing made by F/Lt Boyce flying a Blackburn Dart onto HMS Furious
- September – HMS Furious re-enters service with flush flight deck.
- 3 October – USS Lexington launched.

1926

- 6 May – First night deck landing, aboard HMS Furious.

1927

- 25 March – Akagi commissioned
- May – Béarn commissioned.
- 16 November – USS Saratoga commissioned.
- 14 December – USS Lexington commissioned.

1928

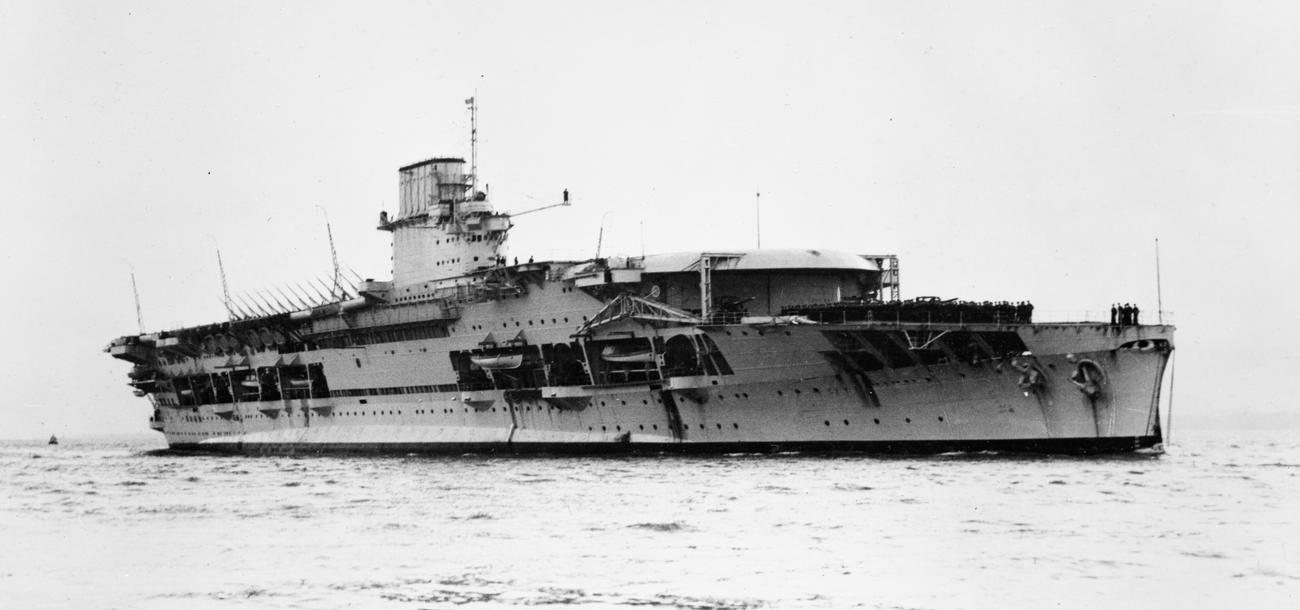
HMS Courageous

- 5 May – HMS Courageous commissioned as a carrier; first carrier to be fitted with transverse arrestor gear (friction-based).
- 31 March – Kaga commissioned.

1929

- 26 November – Ryūjō laid down.

=== 1930–1939 ===
1930

- 10 March – HMS Glorious recommissioned as an aircraft carrier.
- March – HMS Argus placed in reserve.

1931

- 2 January – First carrier fitted with hydraulic arresting gear, HMS Courageous.
- 2 April – Ryūjō launched.
- 26 September – USS Ranger laid down.

1933

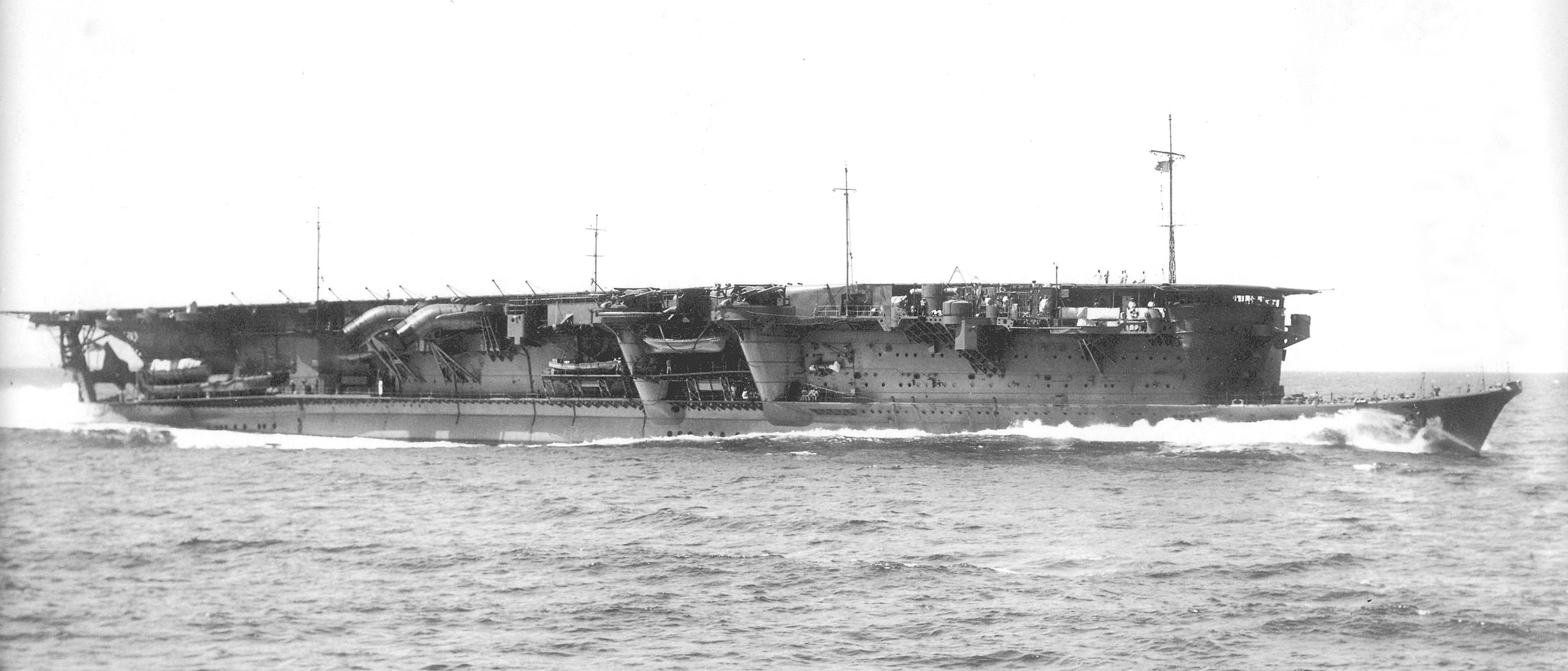
Japanese carrier Ryūjō

- 25 February – USS Ranger launched.
- 9 May – Ryūjō commissioned.

1934

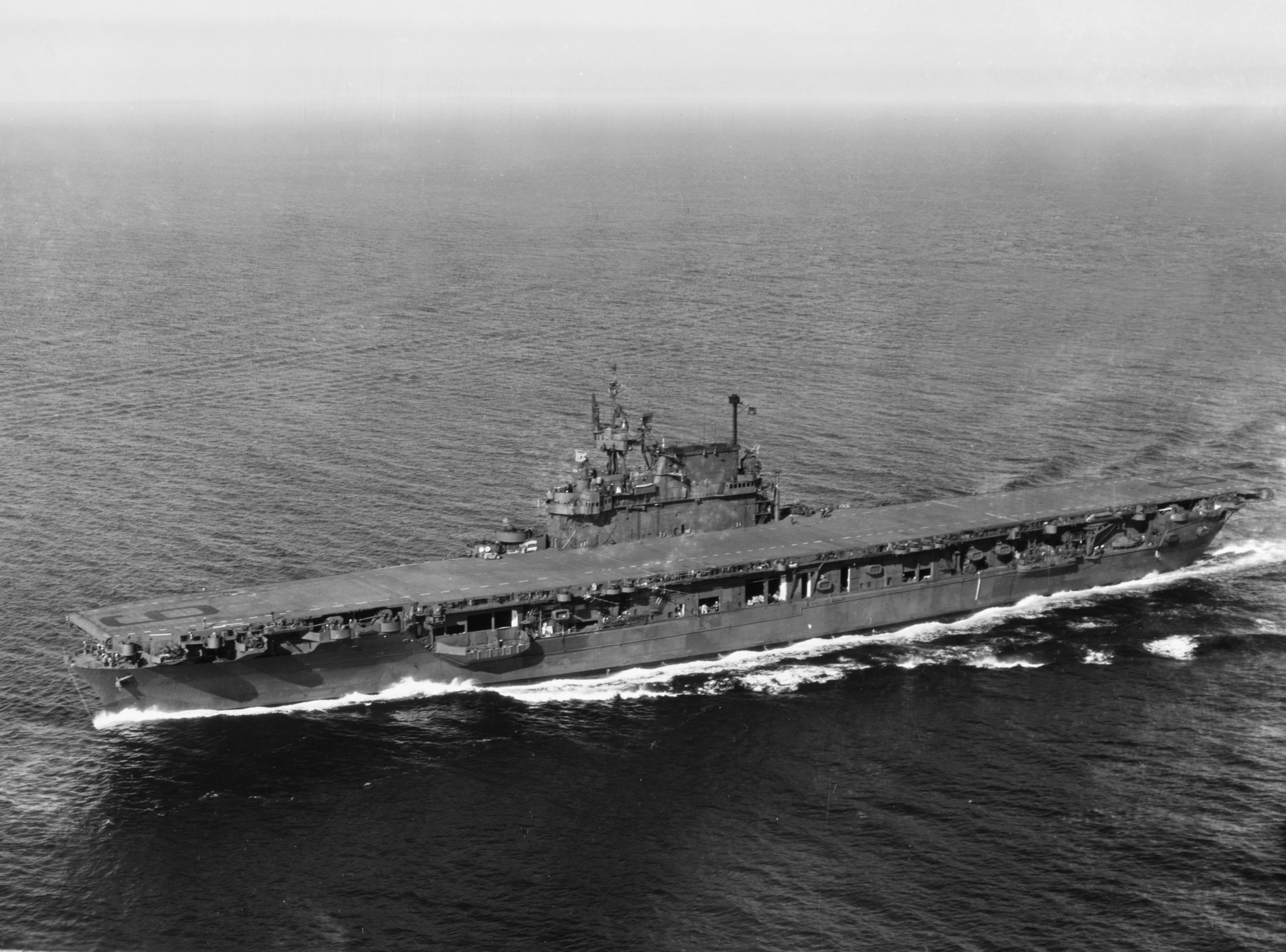
USS Enterprise

- 21 May – USS Yorktown laid down.
- 4 June – USS Ranger commissioned.
- 16 July – USS Enterprise laid down.
- 20 November – Sōryū laid down.

1935

- 9 September – First landing of a rotary winged aircraft aboard a carrier – a Cierva autogyro onto HMS Furious
- 16 September – HMS Ark Royal laid down.
- 21 December – Sōryū launched.

1936

- 15 January – Japan exits the Washington Naval Treaty.
- 1 April – USS Wasp laid down.
- 4 April – USS Yorktown launched.
- 8 July – Hiryū laid down.
- 3 October – USS Enterprise launched.
- 25 October – USS Langley taken in hand for conversion to a seaplane tender.
- 28 December – Flugzeugträger A (Graf Zeppelin) laid down.

1937

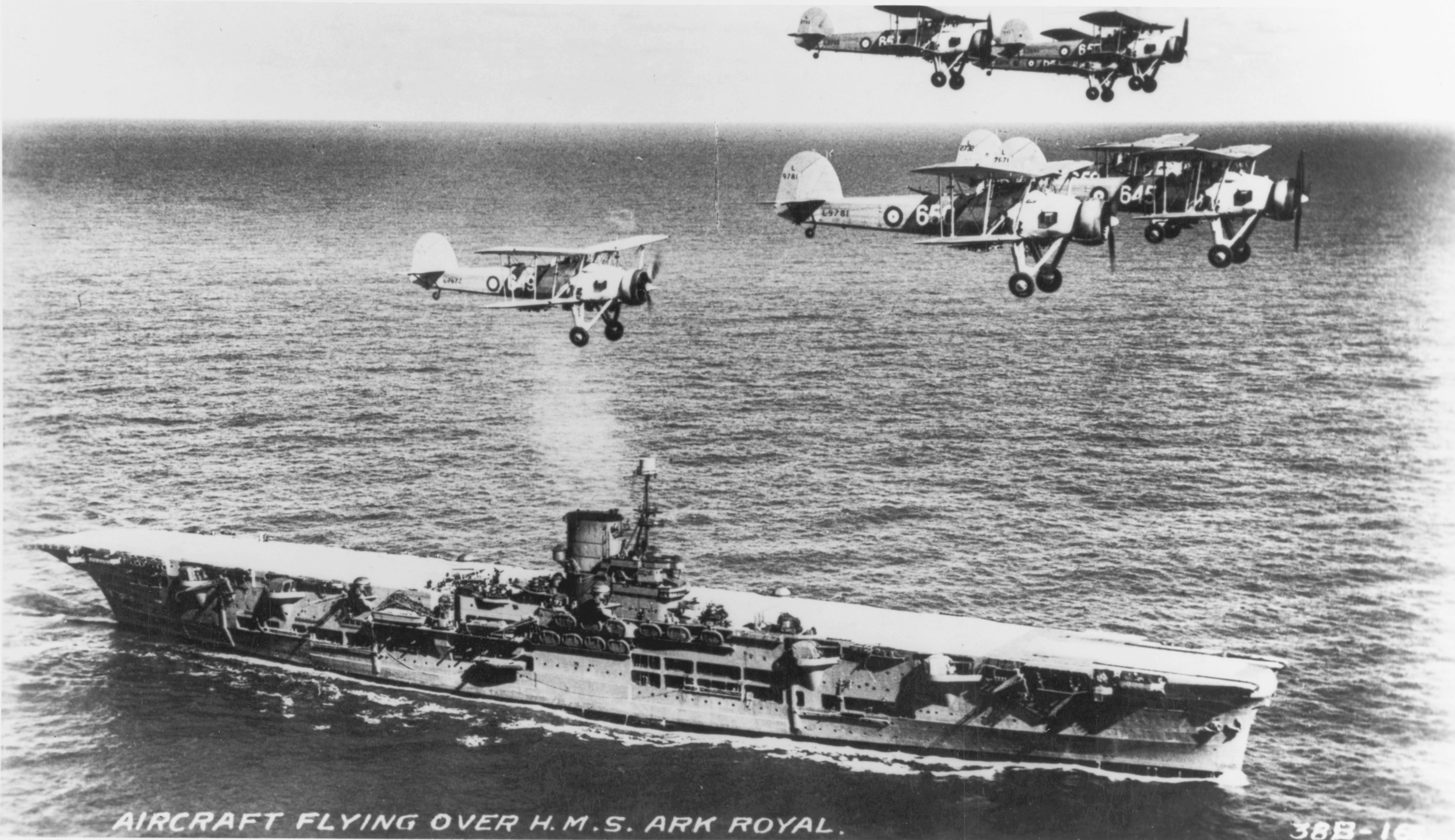
HMS Ark Royal

- 29 January – Sōryū commissioned.
- 26 February – USS Langley recommissioned as a seaplane tender.
- 13 April – HMS Ark Royal launched.
- 27 April – HMS Illustrious laid down.
- 4 May – HMS Victorious laid down.
- 17 June – HMS Formidable laid down.
- 30 September – USS Yorktown commissioned.
- 10 November – HMS Indomitable laid down.
- 16 November – Hiryū launched.
- 12 December – Shōkaku laid down.

1938

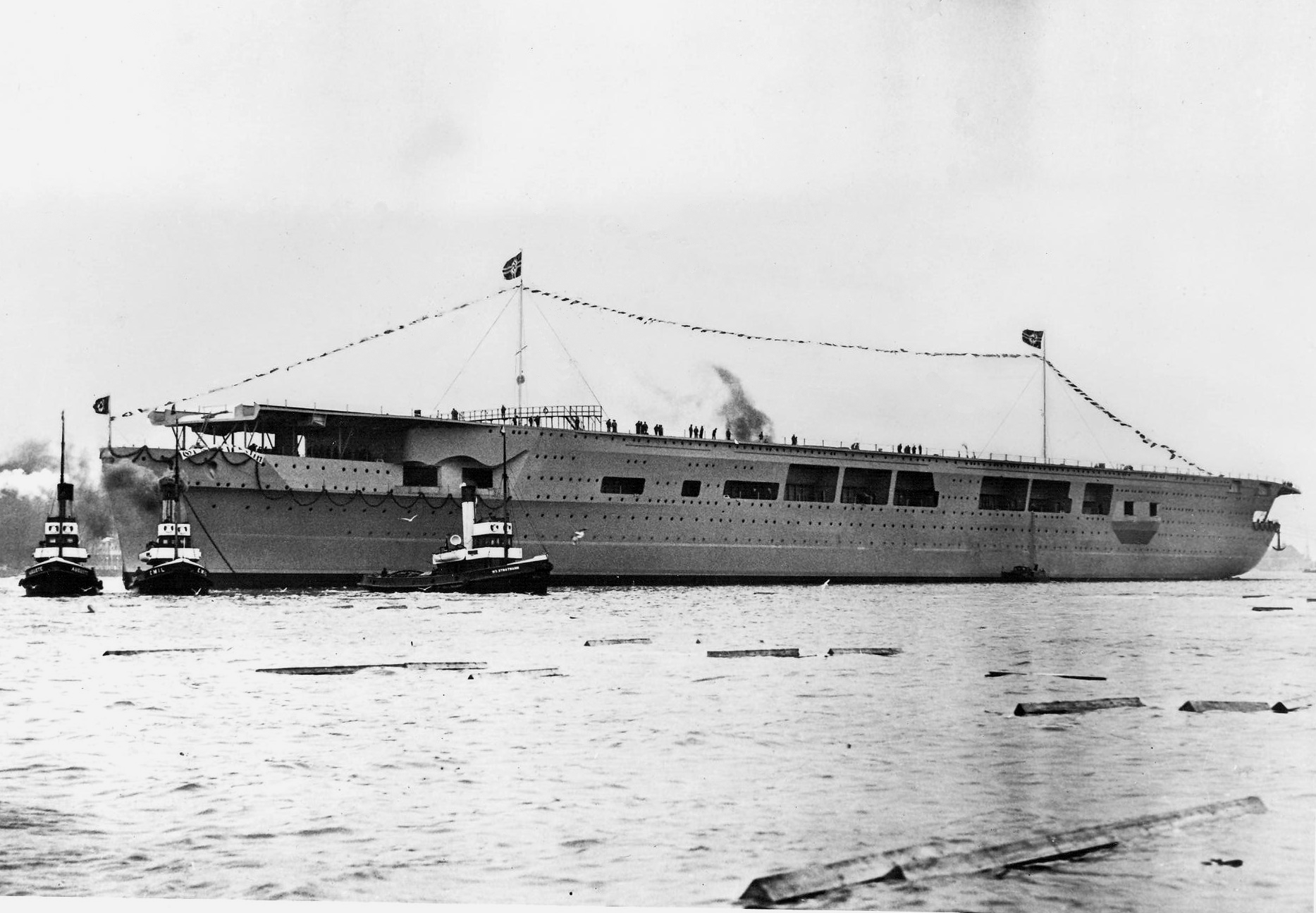
The only German aircraft carrier ever launched, Graf Zeppelin, was never completed

- Takasaki carrier conversion started.
- Flugzeugträger B laid down.
- 12 May – USS Enterprise commissioned.
- 25 May – Zuikaku laid down.
- 8 December – Graf Zeppelin launched.
- 16 December – HMS Ark Royal commissioned; first carrier with deck armour.

1939

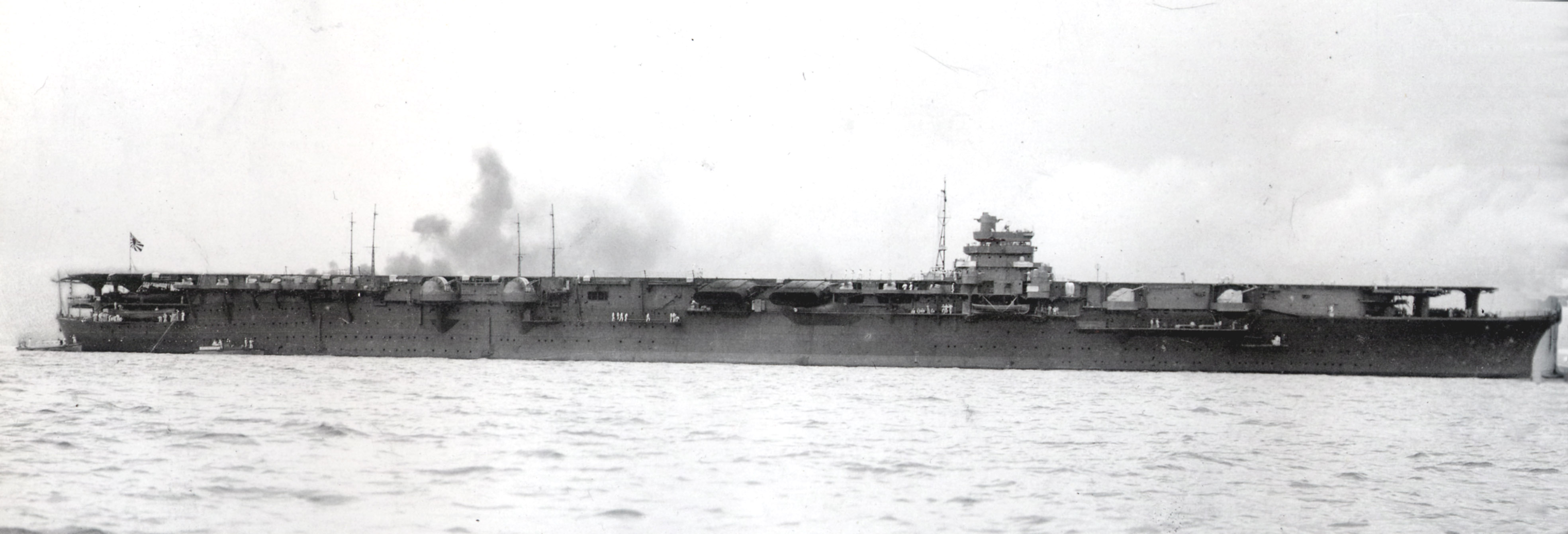
Japanese carrier Shōkaku

- 21 February – HMS Implacable laid down.
- 4 April – USS Wasp launched.
- 5 April – HMS Illustrious launched.
- 1 June – Shōkaku launched.
- 26 June – HMS Unicorn laid down.
- 5 July – Hiryū commissioned.
- 17 August – HMS Formidable launched.

== World War II ==
1939

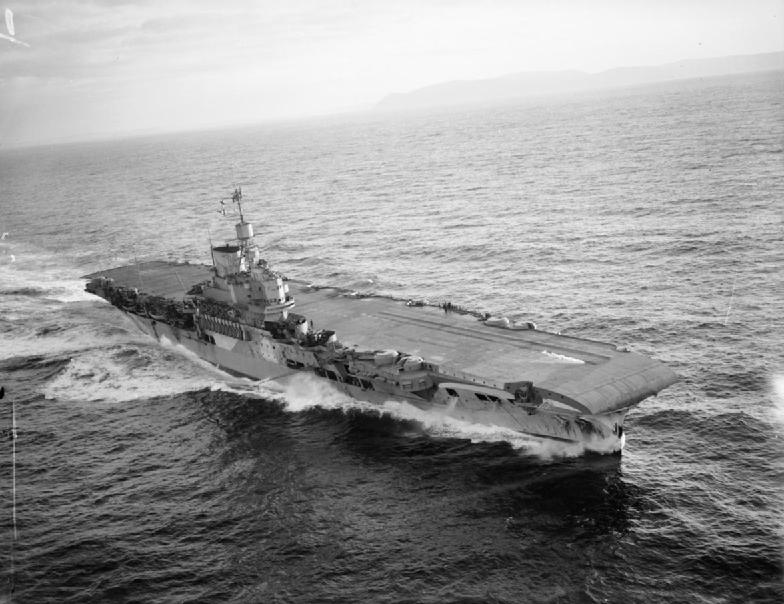
HMS Victorious

- 1 September – Germany invades Poland, World War II begins.
- 14 September – HMS Victorious launched.
- 17 September – HMS Courageous sunk in action.
- 25 September – USS Hornet laid down.
- 26 September – First Allied air victory in WWII, a Dornier Do 18 shot down by Blackburn Skua of 803 Squadron from HMS Ark Royal.
- 27 November – Zuikaku launched.
- 3 November – HMS Indefatigable laid down.

1940

- Conversion of Izumo Maru to carrier started, renamed Hiyō.
- Kashiwara Maru carrier conversion started, renamed Jun'yō.
- HMS Argus recommissioned as training and transport carrier.
- 28 February – German Flugzeugträger B cancelled while under construction.
- 26 March – HMS Indomitable launched.
- 25 April – USS Wasp commissioned.
- May – Graf Zeppelin construction temporarily suspended.
- 25 May – HMS Illustrious commissioned; first fully armoured carrier.
- June – Béarn interned at Martinique.
- 18 June – HMS Glorious sunk in action.
- 21 June – Attack on Scharnhorst, first ever torpedo attack by aircraft on a capital ship at sea.
- 25 June – France falls to Germany.
- 11 November – Battle of Taranto is the first carrier-based torpedo-bomber attack.
- 24 November – HMS Formidable commissioned.
- 14 December – USS Hornet launched.
- 27 December – conversion of Takasaki completed, commissioned as Zuihō.

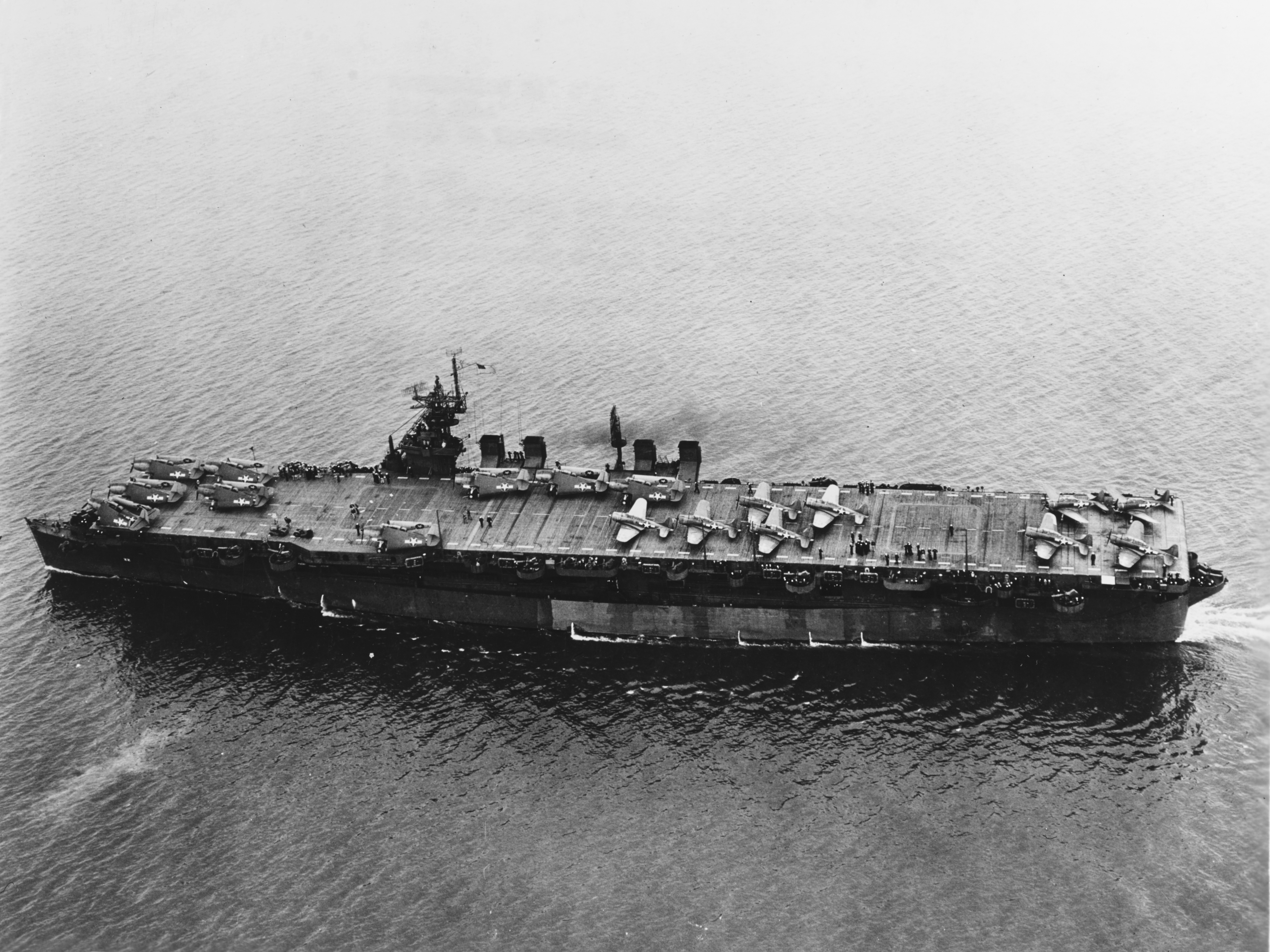
USS Independence

1941

- Submarine tender Tsurugisaki carrier conversion started.
- Italian passenger liner Roma carrier conversion started, renamed Aquila
- 28 April – USS Essex laid down.
- May – Incomplete passenger liners Kasuga Maru, Yawata Maru and Nitta Maru carrier conversions started.
- 1 May – USS Independence laid down as light cruiser USS Amsterdam.
- 26 May – German battleship Bismarck disabled by aircraft launched from HMS Ark Royal. Bismarck is later sunk by battleships.
- 15 May – HMS Victorious commissioned.
- 24 June – Hiyō launched.
- 26 June – Junyō launched.

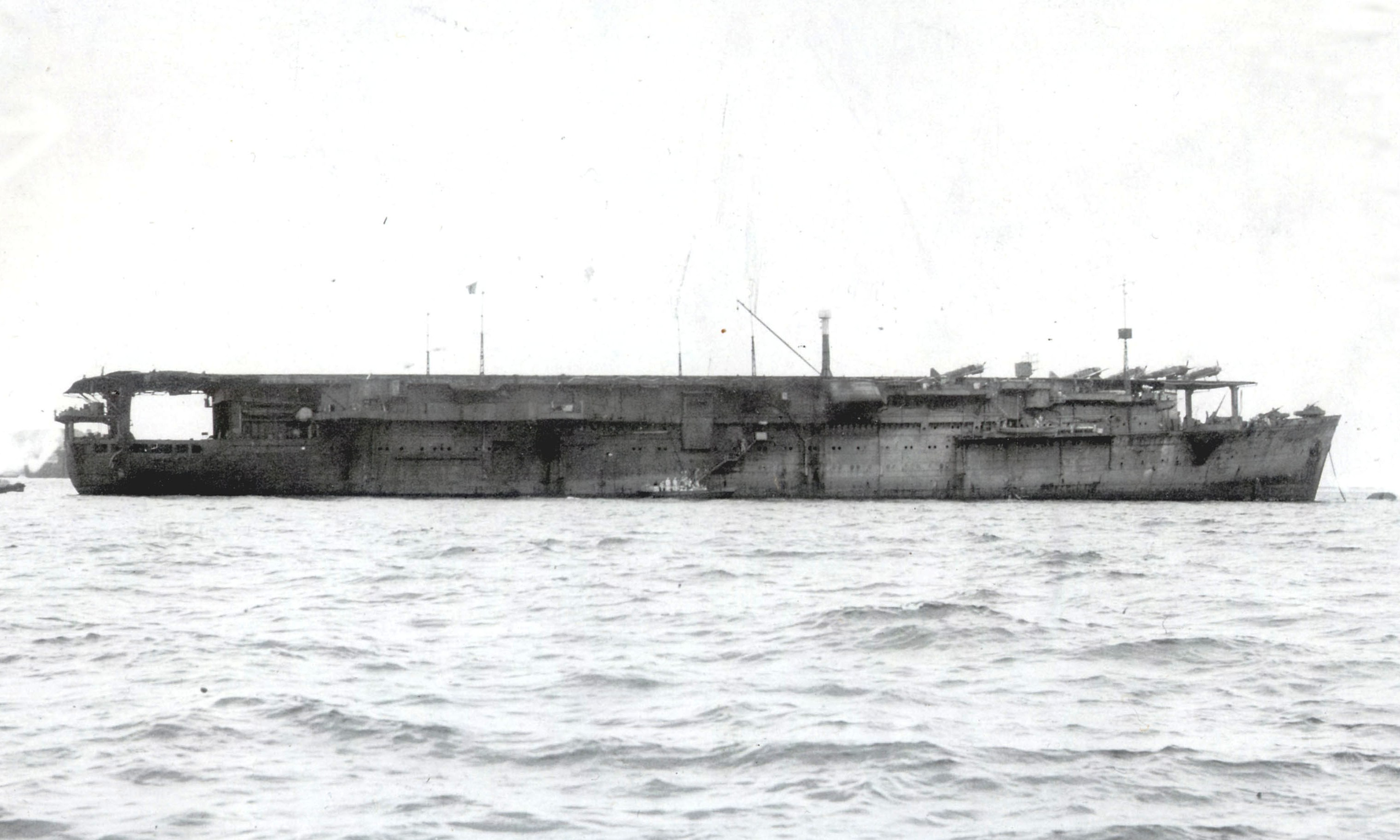
Japanese carrier Taiyō

- 10 July – Taihō laid down.
- 15 July – USS Cabot laid down.
- 8 August – Shōkaku commissioned.
- 2 September – Kasuga Maru carrier conversion completed.
- 15 September – USS Bunker Hill laid down; Kasuga Maru commissioned as Taiyō
- 25 September – Zuikaku commissioned.
- 10 October – HMS Indomitable commissioned.
- 20 October – USS Hornet commissioned.
- 13 November – HMS Ark Royal sunk in action.

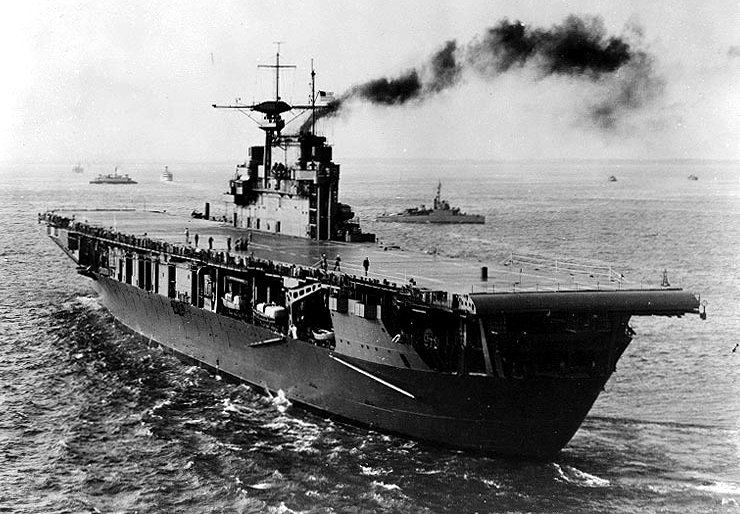
USS Hornet

- 20 November – HMS Unicorn launched.
- 1 December – USS Bon Homme Richard, USS Intrepid laid down.
- 7 December – Japan attacks Pearl Harbor naval base in Hawaii and in Philippines; as a result United States enters World War II.
- 20 December – Submarine tender Taigei carrier conversion started.

1942

- 26 January – Tsurugisaki carrier conversion completed, commissioned as Shōhō.
- February – SS Scharnhorst carrier conversion started by Japan.
- 16 February – Light cruisers USS Tallahassee and USS New Haven reclassified for completion as carriers.
- 27 February – USS Langley sunk in action.
- 16 March – USS Wilmington laid down as light cruiser.
- 18 March – USS Oriskany laid down.

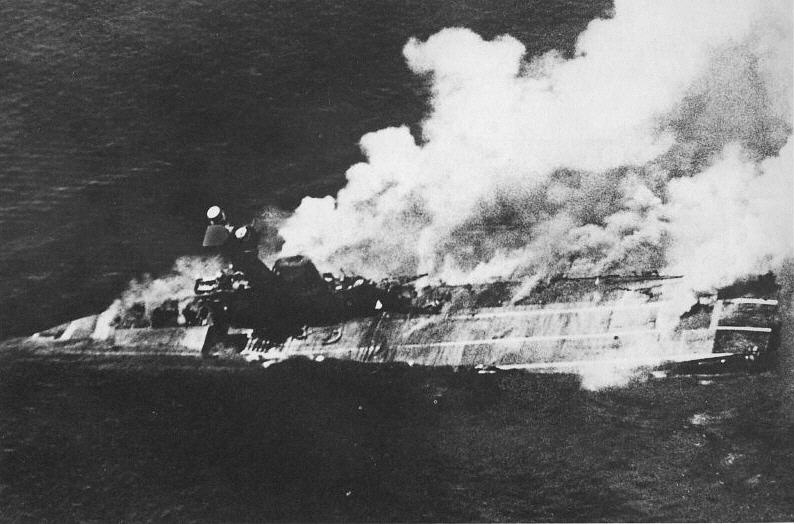
HMS Hermes sinking

- 27 March – Light cruisers USS Dayton and USS Huntington reclassified for completion as carriers; Huntington renamed USS Cowpens.
- 31 March – USS Tallahassee renamed USS Princeton, USS New Haven renamed USS Belleau Wood, USS Dayton renamed USS Monterey.
- 9 April – HMS Hermes sunk in action.
- 11 April – Originally intended as light cruiser USS Fargo, USS Crown Point laid down.
- May – Béarn demilitarised; Graf Zeppelin construction resumed
- 4 May – Battle of the Coral Sea commences – first carrier-to-carrier naval engagement in history, and first naval engagement where neither fleet directly fired upon nor came within sight of the other fleet.
- 5 May – Jun'yō commissioned.
- 7 May – Shōhō sunk in action.

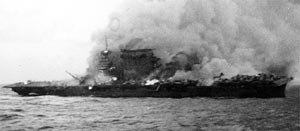
USS Lexington burning during the Battle of the Coral Sea

- 8 May – USS Lexington sunk in action; Battle of the Coral Sea ends.
- 31 May – Yawata Maru carrier conversion completed, commissioned as Unyō.
- June – Incomplete Yamato-class battleship Shinano carrier conversion started.
- 1 June – HMS Colossus laid down, and HMS Edgar laid down.
- 2 June – USS Wilmington re-designated for completion as carrier.
- 4 June – Battle of Midway commenced, generally considered to be the most important naval battle in the Pacific during World War II; Akagi, Kaga, Sōryū severely damaged in action, with Kaga and Sōryū subsequently scuttled.
- 5 June – Hiryū sunk in action, Akagi scuttled.
- 7 June – USS Yorktown sunk in action; Battle of Midway ended.
- 16 June – USS Cabot renamed USS Lexington.
- 23 June – USS Wilmington renamed USS Cabot.

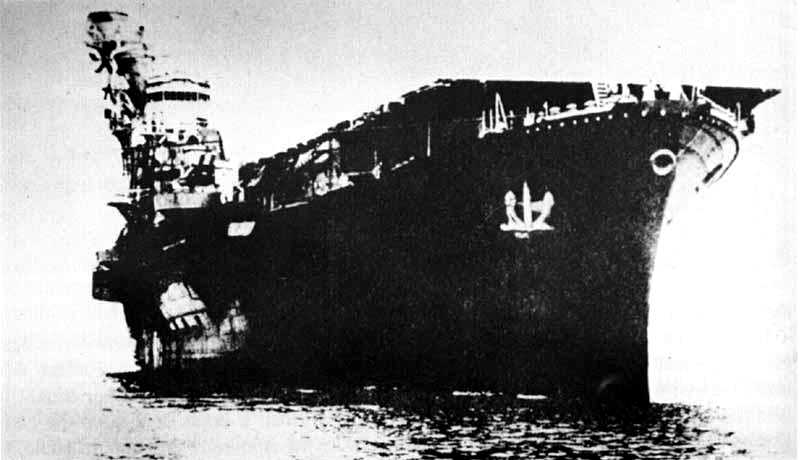
Japanese carrier Japanese aircraft carrier Hiyō

- 31 July – Hiyō commissioned; USS Essex launched.
- 1 August – Unryū laid down.
- 3 August – USS Kearsarge laid down.
- 11 August – HMS Eagle sunk in action.
- 22 August – USS Independence launched.
- 24 August – Ryūjō sunk in action.
- 27 August – HMS Glory laid down.
- 31 August – USS Bataan laid down; Kasuga Maru reclassified as warship;

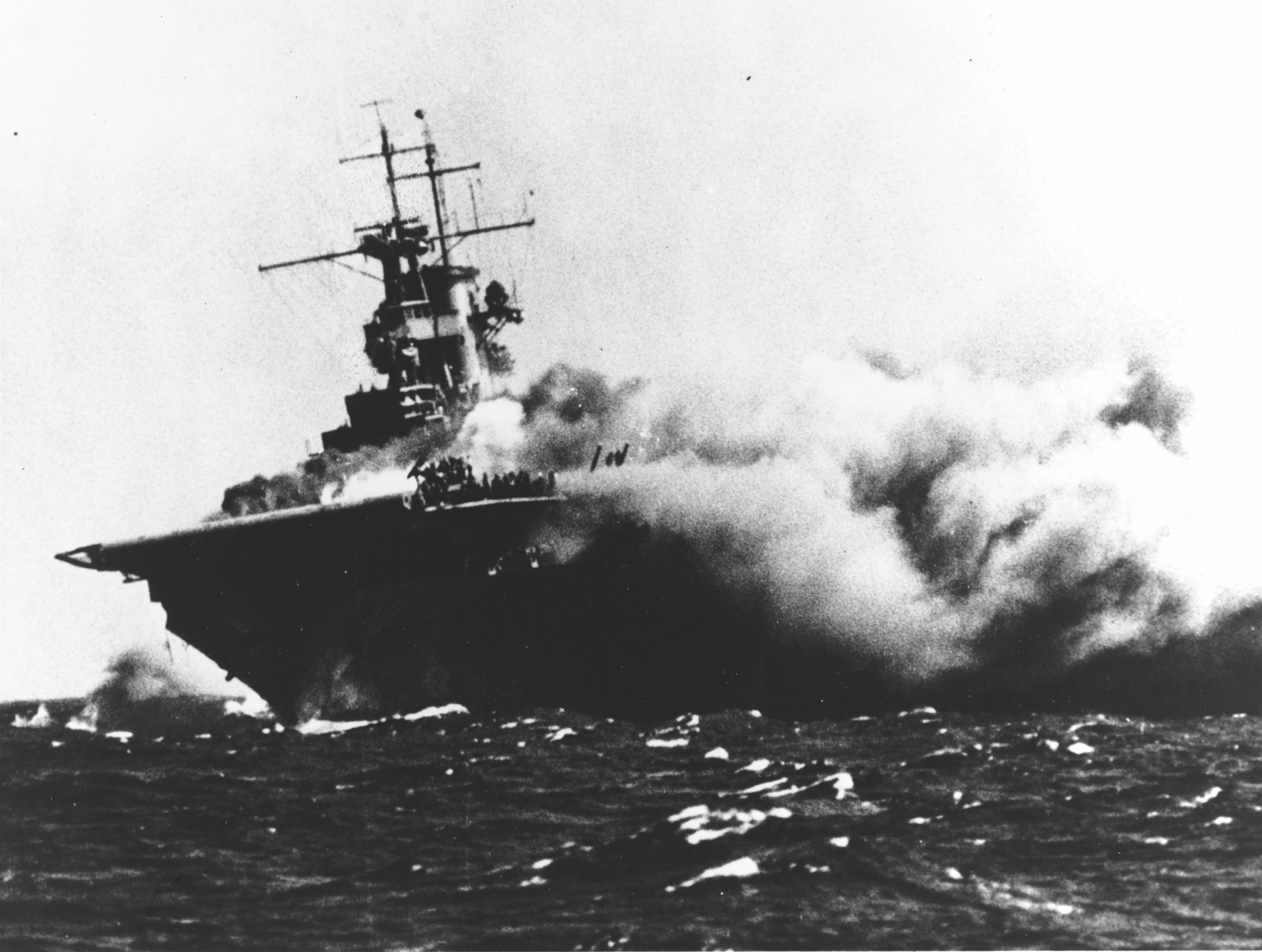
USS Wasp on fire shortly after being torpedoed

- 15 September – USS Wasp sunk in action.
- 26 September – USS Bon Homme Richard renamed USS Yorktown; USS Lexington launched.
- 1 October – Amagi laid down.
- 18 October – USS Princeton launched.
- 24 October – HMS Audacious laid down.
- 26 October – USS Reprisal laid down.
- 27 October – USS Hornet sunk in action.
- 8 November – HMS Ocean laid down.
- 12 November – HMS Vengeance laid down.
- 13 November – USS Crown Point renamed USS Langley, USS Oriskany renamed USS Wasp.

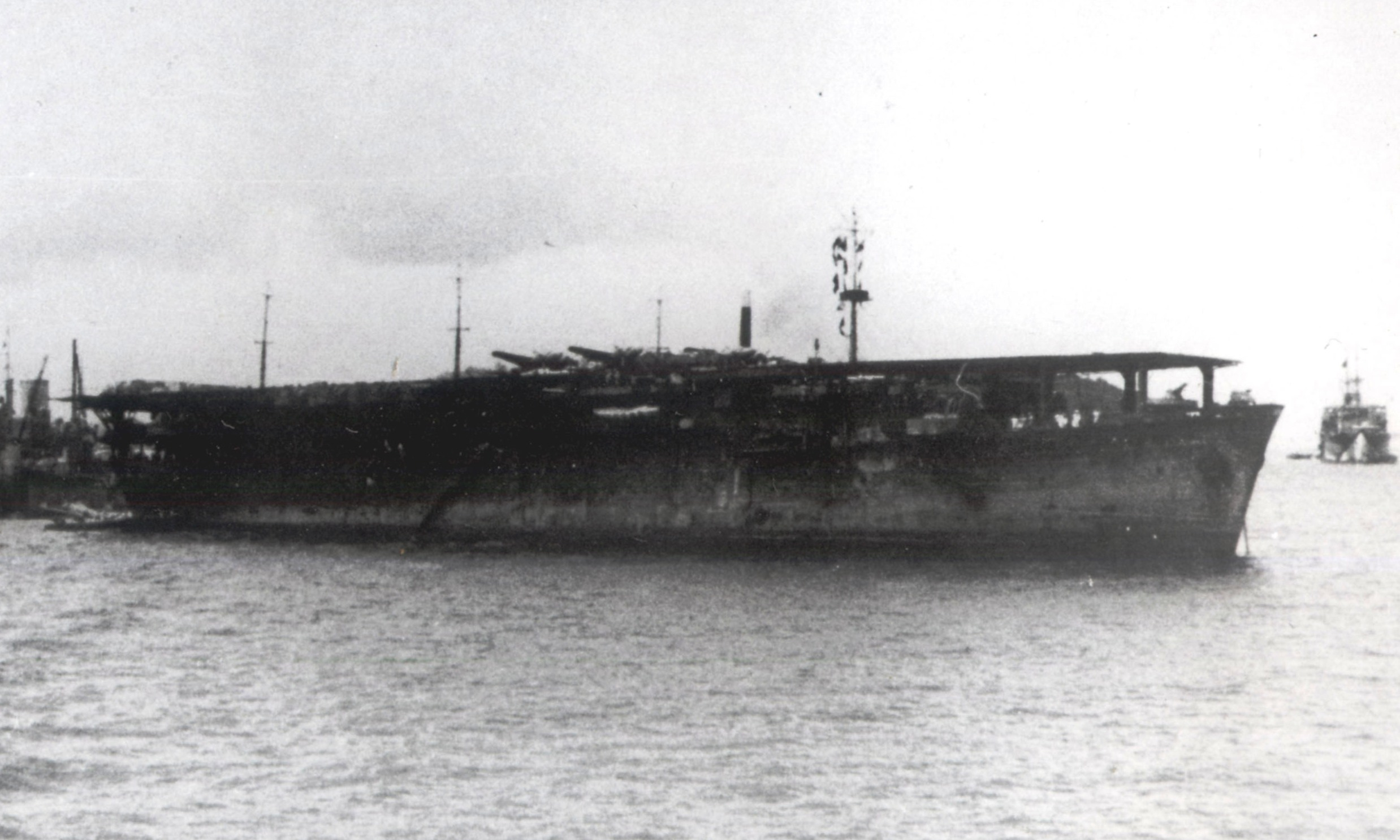
Japanese carrier Chūyō

- 25 November – Nitta Maru carrier conversion completed, renamed and commissioned as Chūyō.
- 28 November – Taigei carrier conversion completed, renamed and commissioned as Ryūhō.
- 2 December – HMS Ethalion laid down, subsequently renamed HMS Mars.
- 3 December – HMS Venerable laid down.
- 6 December – USS Belleau Wood launched.
- 7 December – USS Franklin laid down, USS Bunker Hill launched.
- 8 December – Katsuragi laid down; HMS Indefatigable launched.
- 10 December – HMS Implacable launched; Argentina Maru carrier conversion started.
- 12 December – HMS Warrior laid down.
- 15 December – USS Bennington laid down.

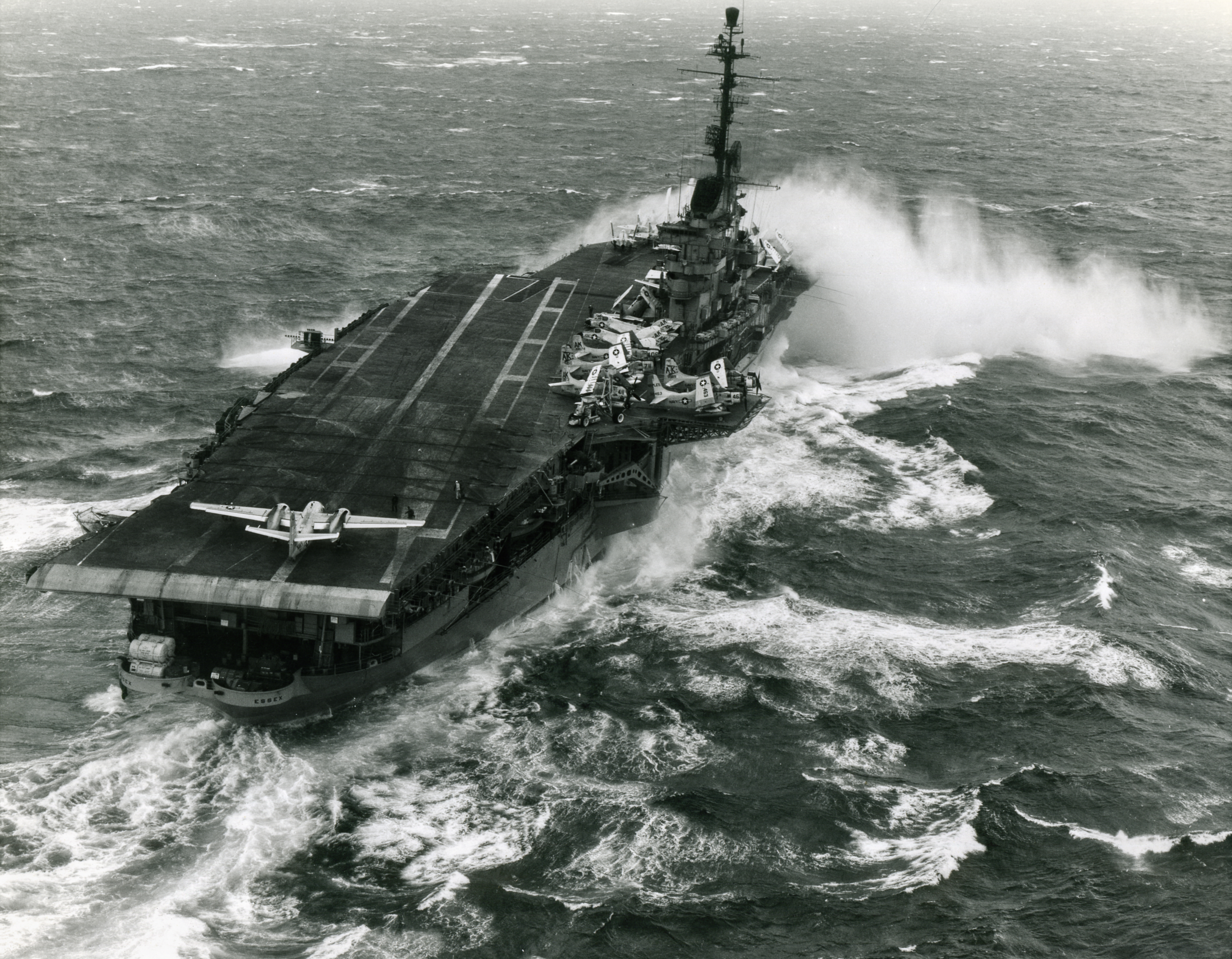
USS Essex

- 31 December – USS Essex commissioned.

1943

- 6 January – HMS Theseus laid down.
- 14 January – USS Independence commissioned.
- 15 January – USS Shangri-La laid down.
- 17 January – USS Cowpens launched.
- 21 January – USS Yorktown launched.
- 22 January – USS Kearsarge renamed USS Hornet.
- 26 January – Chitose carrier conversion started; USS Ticonderoga laid down.
- 27 January – HMS Triumph laid down.
- 30 January – USS Reprisal renamed USS San Jacinto; Graf Zeppelin construction stopped and project cancelled.
- February – SS Scharnhorst acquired to be completed as Shinyo.
- 1 February – USS Hancock and USS Bon Homme Richard laid down.
- 17 February – USS Lexington commissioned.

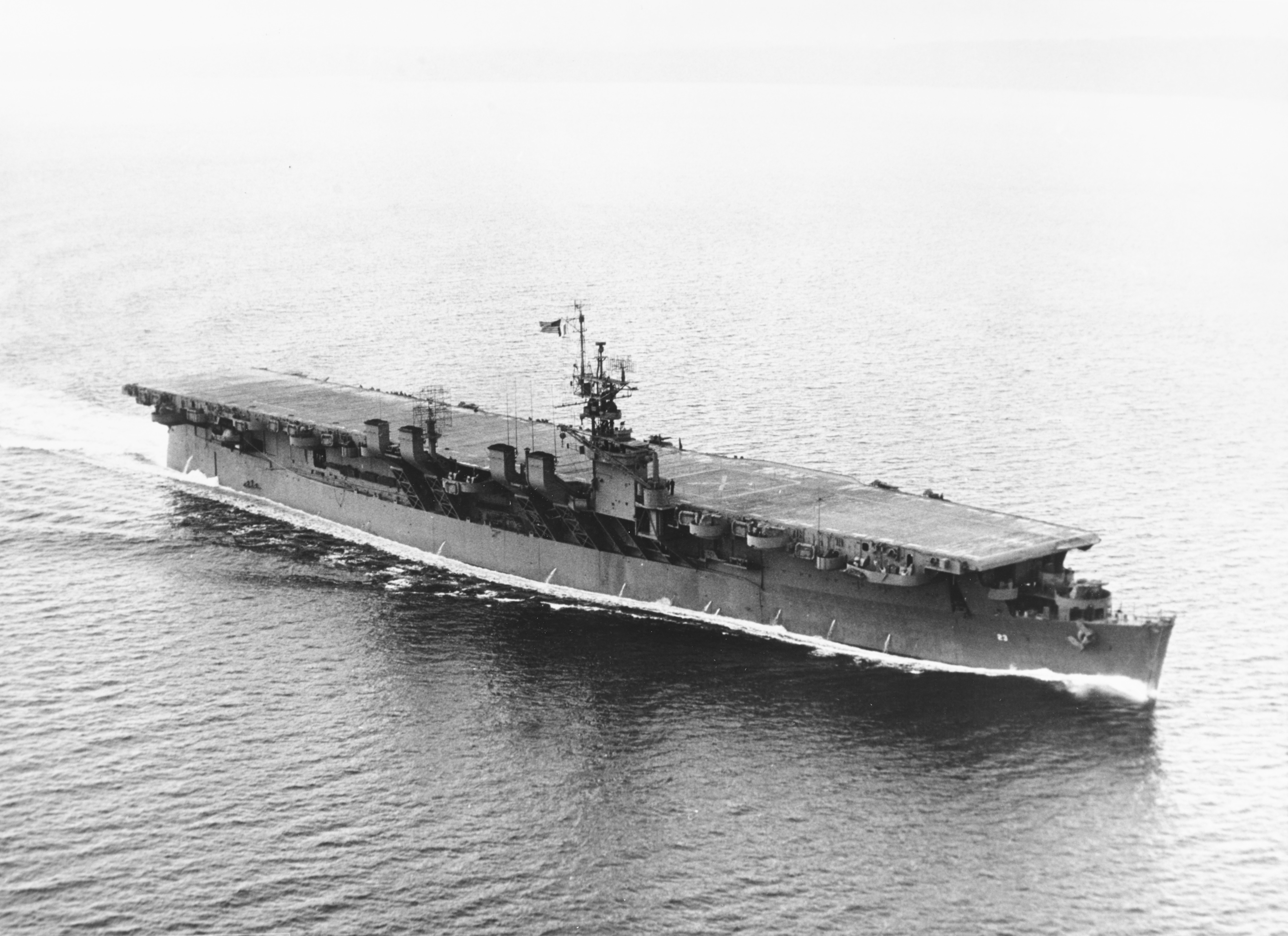
USS Princeton

- 25 February – USS Princeton commissioned.
- 28 February – USS Monterey launched.
- March – Chiyoda carrier conversion started.
- 12 March – HMS Unicorn commissioned.
- 15 March – USS Antietam and USS Lake Champlain laid down.
- 31 March – USS Belleau Wood commissioned.
- 4 April – USS Cabot launched.
- 7 April – Taihō launched.
- 14 April – Kasagi laid down.
- 15 April – HMS Majestic laid down; USS Yorktown commissioned.
- 19 April – HMS Terrible laid down.
- 26 April – USS Intrepid launched.
- 1 May – USS Hancock renamed USS Ticonderoga, USS Ticonderoga renamed USS Hancock.
- 3 May – HMS Ark Royal laid down.
- 10 May – USS Randolph laid down.
- 22 May – USS Langley launched.
- 24 May – USS Bunker Hill commissioned.
- 28 May – USS Cowpens commissioned.
- 8 June – Aso laid down.

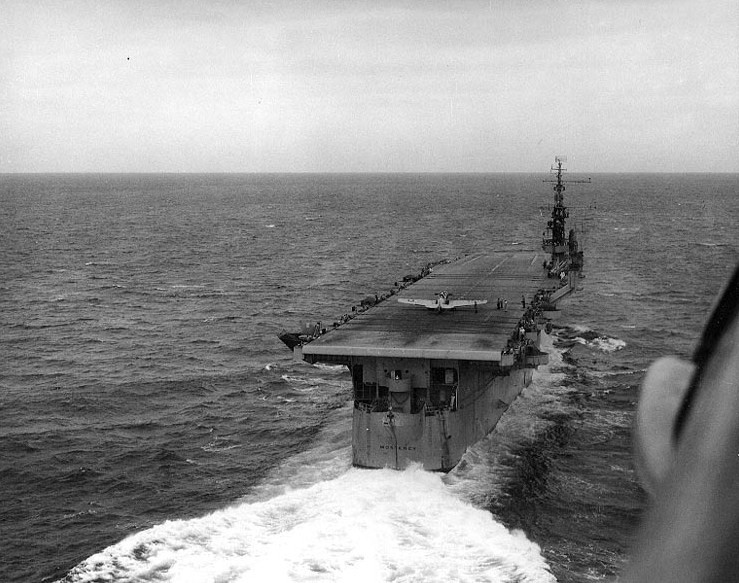
USS Monterey

- 17 June – USS Monterey commissioned.
- 30 June – Béarn transferred to the Free French forces.
- 5 July – Ikoma laid down.
- 24 July – USS Cabot commissioned.
- 29 July – HMS Magnificent laid down.
- 1 August – USS Bataan launched.
- 16 August – USS Intrepid commissioned.
- 17 August – USS Wasp launched.
- 30 August – USS Hornet launched.
- 31 August – USS Langley commissioned.
- September – Incomplete carrier Aquila taken over by Germany after Italian surrender, but never completed
- 13 September – USS Boxer laid down.
- 14 September – USS Valley Forge laid down.
- 25 September – Unryū launched.
- 26 September – USS San Jacinto launched.
- 30 September – HMS Colossus launched.
- 12 October – HMS Hercules laid down.
- 14 October – USS Franklin launched.
- 15 October – Amagi launched.
- 18 October – HMS Leviathan laid down.
- 27 October – USS Midway laid down.
- 31 October – Chiyoda carrier conversion completed, recommissioned.
- 15 November – ex-SS Scharnhorst commissioned as Shinyo; USS San Jacinto commissioned.
- 17 November – USS Bataan commissioned.

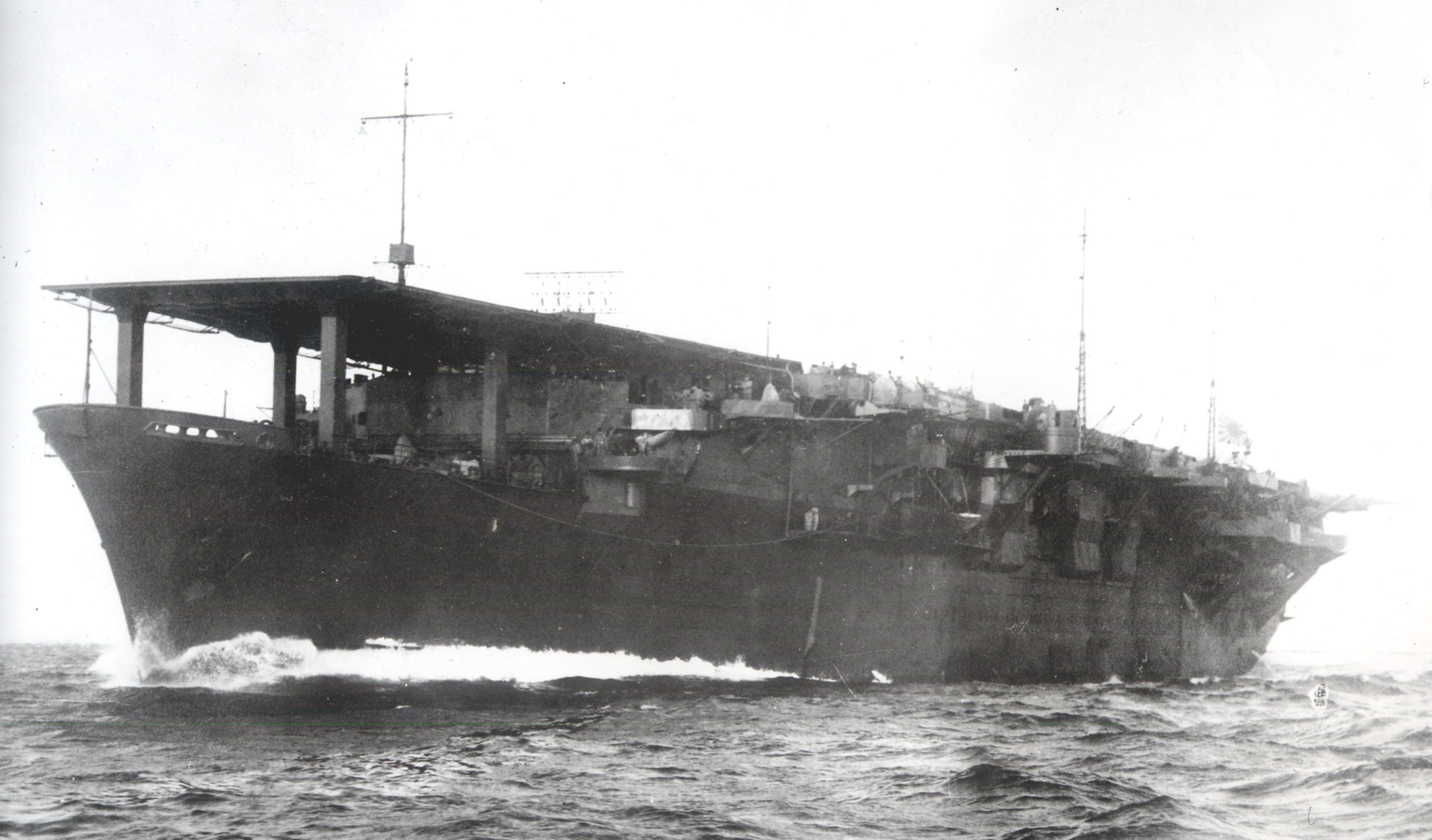
Japanese carrier Kaiyo

- 23 November – Argentina Maru carrier conversion completed, commissioned as Kaiyo.
- 24 November – USS Wasp commissioned.
- 27 November – HMS Glory launched,HMS Powerful laid down.
- 29 November – USS Hornet commissioned.
- 1 December – USS Coral Sea laid down.
- 4 December – Chūyō sunk in action.
- 30 December – HMS Venerable launched.

1944

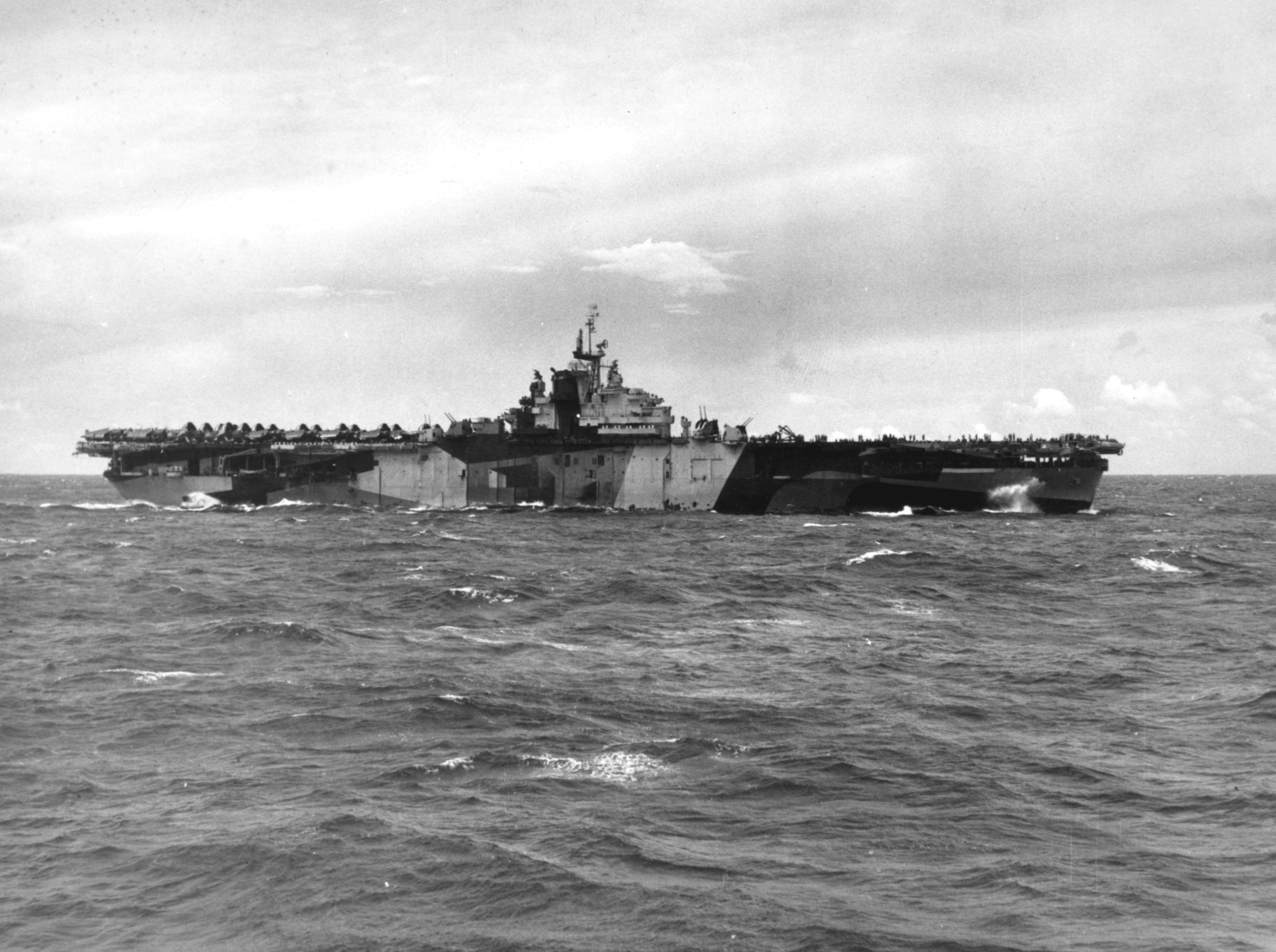
USS Franklin

- 1 January – Chitose carrier conversion completed, commissioned.
- 19 January – Katsuragi launched.
- 24 January – USS Hancock launched.
- 31 January – USS Franklin commissioned.
- 7 February – USS Ticonderoga launched.
- 21 February – USS Crown Point laid down.
- 23 February – HMS Vengeance launched.
- 24 February – USS Shangri-La launched.
- 26 February – USS Bennington launched.
- 1 March – USS Tarawa, USS Kearsarge laid down.
- 7 March – Taihō commissioned.
- 23 March – HMS Albion laid down.
- 25 March – First deck landing by a twin engined aircraft, a Mosquito on HMS Indefatigable.
- 26 March – HMS Edgar launched.
- 15 April – USS Hancock commissioned.
- 29 April – USS Bon Homme Richard launched.
- 1 May – USS Oriskany laid down.

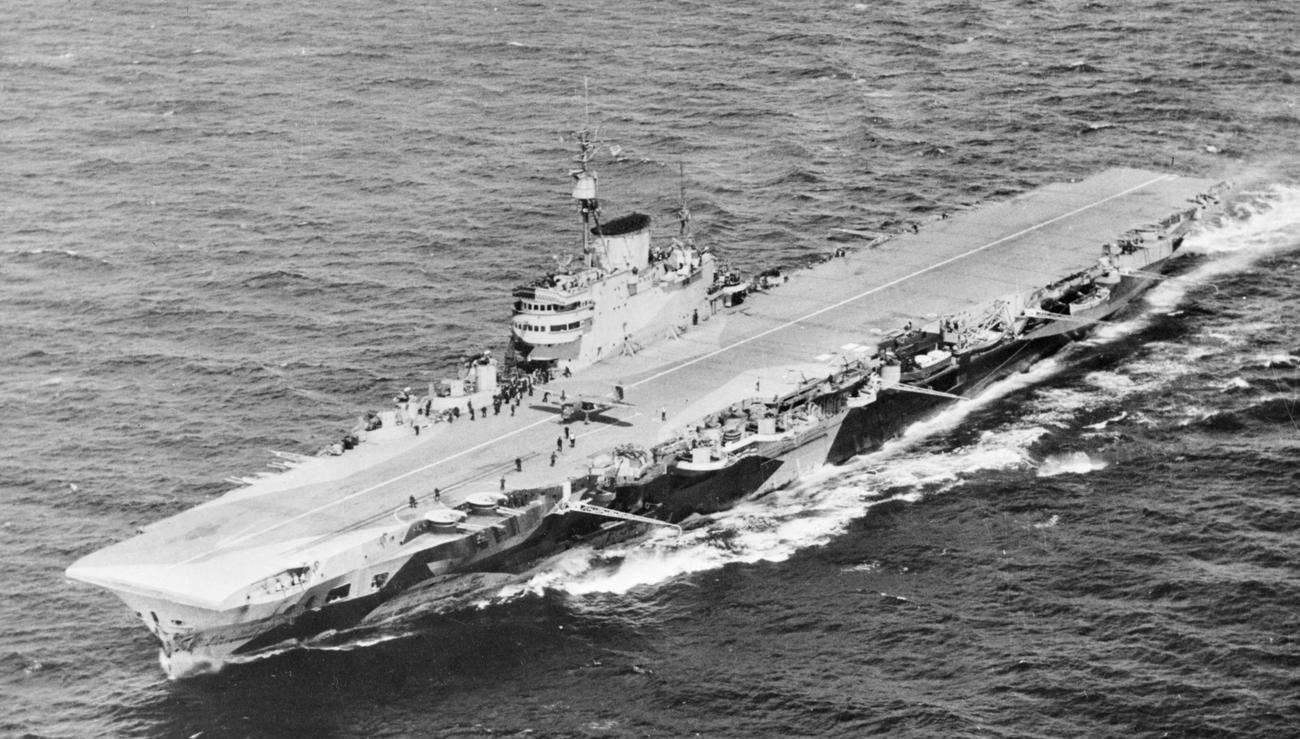
HMS Indefatigable

- 3 May – HMS Indefatigable commissioned.
- 8 May – USS Ticonderoga commissioned.
- 20 May – HM Ships Mars and Warrior launched.
- 30 May – HMS Centaur laid down.
- 19 June – Shōkaku and Taihō sunk in action.
- 20 June – Hiyō sunk in action.
- 21 June – HMS Hermes laid down as HMS Elephant (construction suspended at end of WWII).
- 28 June – USS Randolph launched.
- 1 July – USS Reprisal laid down.
- 6 July – HMS Theseus launched.
- 8 July – HMS Ocean launched;
- 10 July – USS Coral Sea and USS Saipan laid down.
- 6 August – Unryū commissioned; USS Bennington commissioned.
- 10 August – Amagi commissioned.
- 18 August – Taiyō sunk in action.
- 19 August – USS Philippine Sea laid down.
- 20 August – USS Antietam launched.
- 21 August – USS Wright laid down.
- 28 August – HMS Implacable commissioned.
- 7 September – USS Valley Forge (CV-45) laid down.
- 15 September – USS Shangri-La commissioned; HMS Furious decommissioned, placed in reserve.
- 16 September – Unyō sunk in action.
- 30 September – HMS Terrible launched.
- 2 October – HMS Triumph launched.

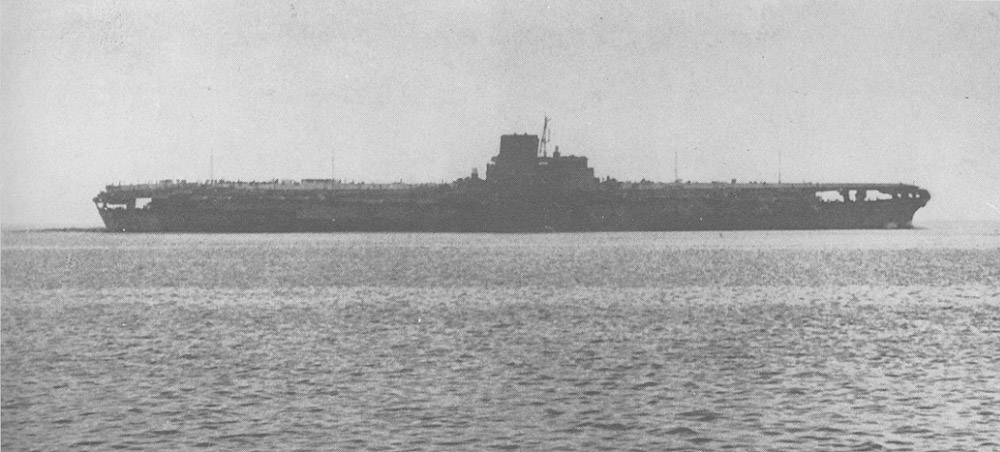
Japanese carrier Shinano

- 8 October – Shinano launched.
- 9 October – USS Randolph commissioned.
- 15 October – Katsuragi commissioned.
- 19 October – Kasagi launched, never completed and broken up after the war.
- 24 October – USS Princeton sunk in action.
- 25 October – Chitose, Chiyoda, Zuihō and Zuikaku sunk in action.
- 1 November – Aso launched, never completed and broken up after the war.
- 2 November – USS Lake Champlain launched.
- 16 November – HMS Magnificent launched.
- 17 November – Ikoma launched, never completed and broken up after the war; Shinyo sunk in action.
- 18 November – USS Valley Forge (CV-45) launched.
- 19 November – Shinano commissioned.
- 21 November – USS Valley Forge (CV-37) renamed USS Princeton.
- 26 November – USS Bon Homme Richard commissioned.
- 29 November – Shinano sunk in action.
- December – HMS Argus designated an accommodation ship.
- 14 December – USS Boxer launched.

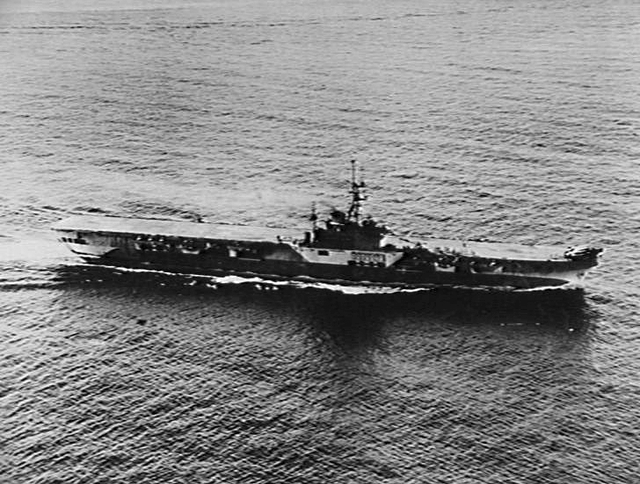
HMS Colossus

- 16 December – HMS Colossus commissioned.
- 19 December – Unryū sunk in action.

1945

- 15 January – HMS Vengeance commissioned.
- 28 January – USS Antietam commissioned.
- 8 February – HMS Mars commissioned as HMS Pioneer.
- 27 February – HMS Powerful launched (construction suspended at end of WWII).
- 28 February – HMS Majestic launched.
- 17 January – HMS Venerable commissioned.
- March – Ryūhō severely damaged by US air attack.
- 20 March – USS Midway launched.
- 2 April – HMS Glory commissioned.
- 9 April – Escort carrier HMS Biter returned to U.S. Navy, immediately transferred to France, recommissioned as Dixmude.
- 16 April – USS Boxer commissioned.

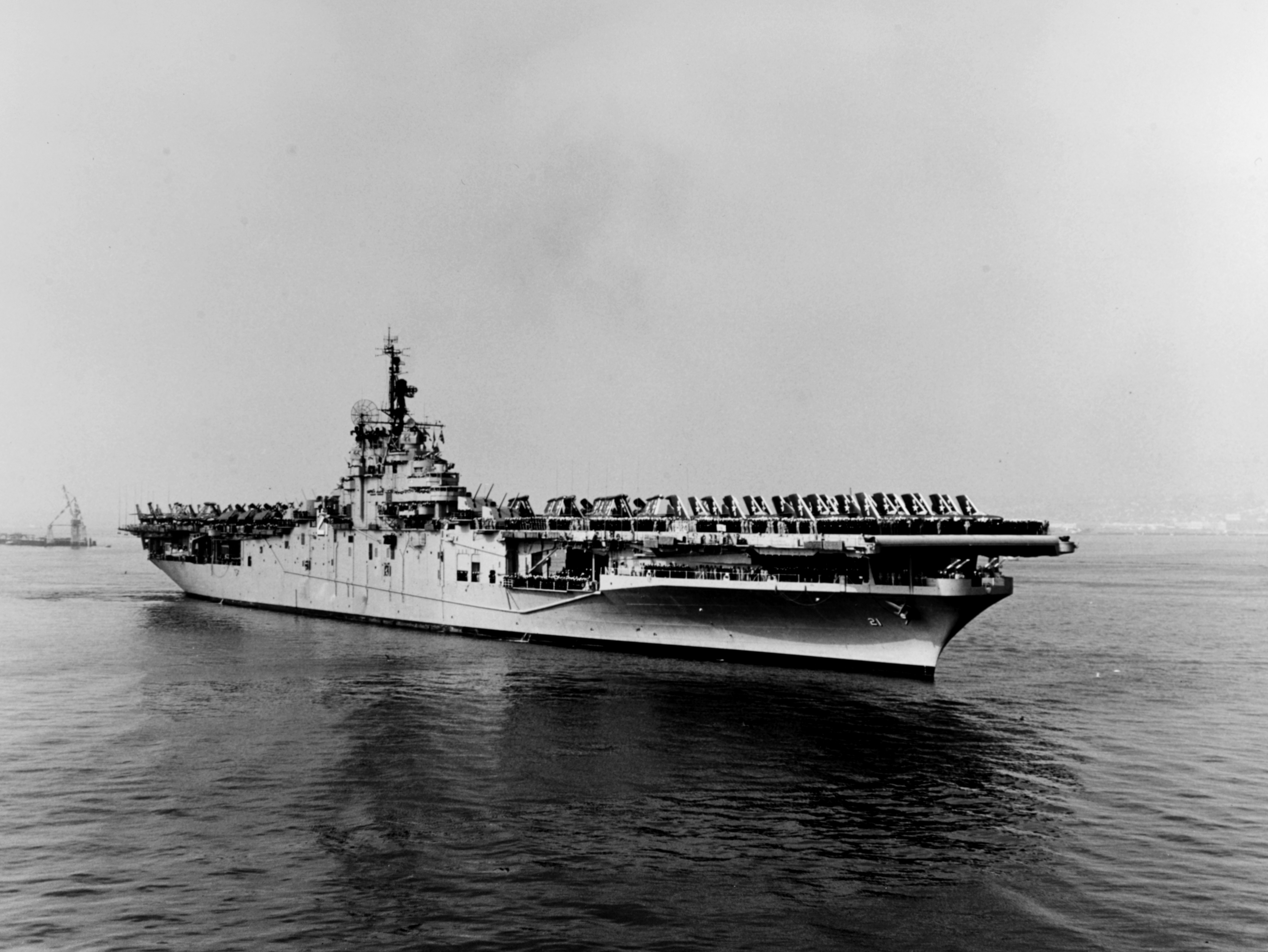
USS Boxer

- 20 April – Ryūhō placed in reserve.
- 25 April – Incomplete Graf Zeppelin scuttled by Germany.
- 29 April – USS Coral Sea launched.
- 5 May – USS Kearsarge launched.
- 7 May – Nazi Germany surrenders.
- 8 May – USS Crown Point renamed USS Leyte, USS Coral Sea renamed USS Franklin D. Roosevelt.
- 12 May – USS Tarawa launched.
- 10 May – HMS Bulwark laid down.
- 3 June – USS Lake Champlain commissioned.
- 7 June – HMS Leviathan launched (ship never completed).
- 8 July – USS Princeton and USS Saipan launched.
- 24 July – Amagi heavily damaged during air raid.
- 25 July – Kaiyo, having been damaged in action the previous day, is deliberately grounded and later refloated.
- 28 July – Kaiyo further damaged in action, settles on bottom with 20-degree list to port.
- 29 July – Attempts to refloat Kaiyo abandoned.
- 29 July – Amagi capsized.
- 6 August – U.S. nuclear strike on Hiroshima.
- 8 August – HMS Ocean commissioned.
- 9 August – Last of caretaker crew leave Kaiyo; U.S. nuclear strike on Nagasaki.
- 12 August – USS Reprisal canceled.
- 15 August – Japan surrenders; WWII ends.

== Post-war 1945–1949 ==
1945

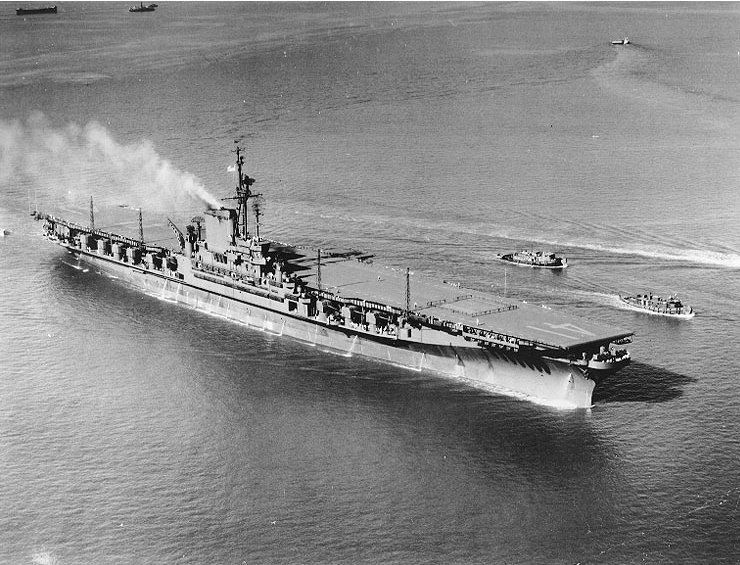
USS Midway

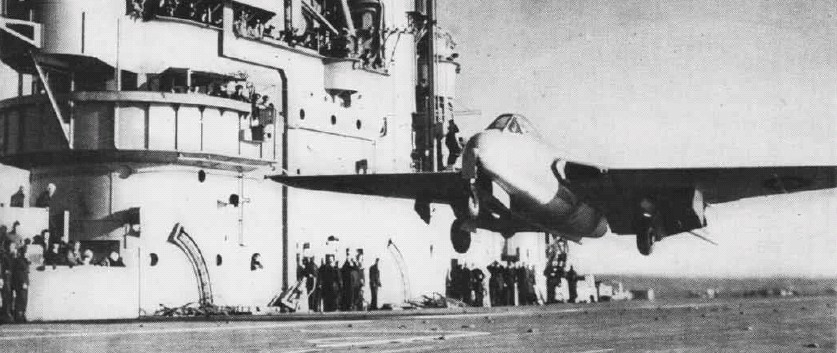
The first carrier landing and take-off of a jet aircraft: Eric "Winkle" Brown landing on HMS Ocean (R68) in 1945.

- USS Reprisal (incomplete) launched to clear slipway.
- 8 July – USS Valley Forge (CV-45) launched.
- 23 August – USS Leyte launched.
- 1 September – USS Wright launched.
- 5 September – USS Philippine Sea launched.
- 10 September – USS Midway commissioned.
- 22 September – HMS Hercules launched, laid up for possible future use.
- 13 October – USS Oriskany launched; Katsuragi assigned to repatriation duty.
- 19 October – HMS Edgar renamed and commissioned as HMS Perseus.
- 27 October – USS Franklin D. Roosevelt commissioned.
- 18 November – USS Princeton commissioned.
- 20 November – Kaiyo decommissioned.
- 30 November – Junyō and Ryūhō decommissioned.
- 3 December – First landing by a jet-powered aircraft on a carrier, HMS Ocean.
- 8 December – USS Tarawa commissioned.

1946

- Ryūhō sold for scrap.
- HMS Unicorn decommissioned and placed in reserve;
- January – HMS Audacious renamed HMS Eagle.
- 9 February – HMS Theseus commissioned.
- March – Graf Zeppelin refloated by the Soviet Union, repaired, and designated "PO-101" (Floating Base Number 101).
- 2 March – USS Kearsarge commissioned.
- 14 Mar – HMS Warrior commissioned as HMCS Warrior.
- 19 March – HMS Eagle launched.
- April – Katsuragi placed on standby.
- 2 April – USS Coral Sea launched.
- 11 April – USS Leyte commissioned.

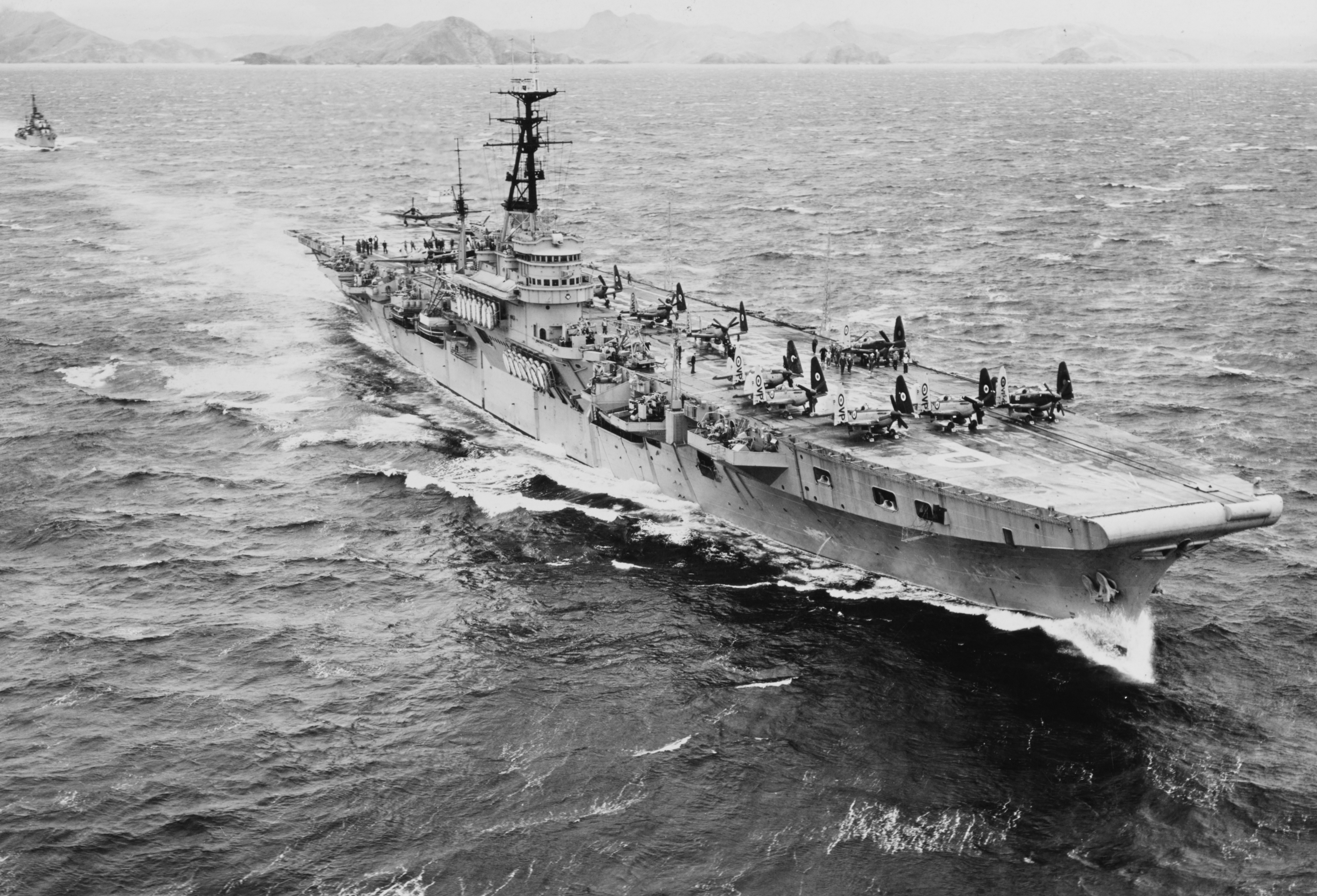
HMS Triumph

- 9 May – HMS Triumph commissioned.
- 11 May – USS Philippine Sea commissioned.
- 1 July – USS Independence and USS Saratoga used during a Bikini Atoll atomic test; both ships were damaged, but survived the test.
- 14 July – USS Saipan commissioned.
- 21 July – FH Phantom became the first purely jet-powered aircraft to operate from an American aircraft carrier.
- 25 July – USS Saratoga sunk by an underwater atomic bomb test at Bikini Island.
- 6 August – HMS Colossus renamed Arromanches and loaned to France.
- 16 August – Hōshō decommissioned.
- 28 August – USS Independence decommissioned.
- September – First helicopter landing aboard a naval escort vessel at sea.
- 1 September – Hulk of Kaiyo sold for scrap.
- 18 October – USS Ranger decommissioned.
- 3 November – USS Valley Forge commissioned.
- 8 November – USS Bennington decommissioned, placed in reserve.
- 15 November – Katsuragi decommissioned.
- December – HMS Indefatigable decommissioned.

- December – HMS Argus sold for scrap.
- 19 December – First Indochina War begins.
- 22 December – Katsuragi sold for scrap.

1947

- HMS Indomitable and HMS Formidable placed in reserve.
- HMS Majestic and HMS Terrible purchased by Australia.
- Junyō sold for scrap.
- 9 January – USS Essex, USS Yorktown, USS Bon Homme Richard, USS Bunker Hill, and USS Ticonderoga decommissioned, placed in reserve.
- 13 January – USS Belleau Wood and USS Cowpens decommissioned, placed in reserve.
- 15 January – USS Hornet decommissioned, placed in reserve.
- 28 January – USS Ranger sold for scrap.

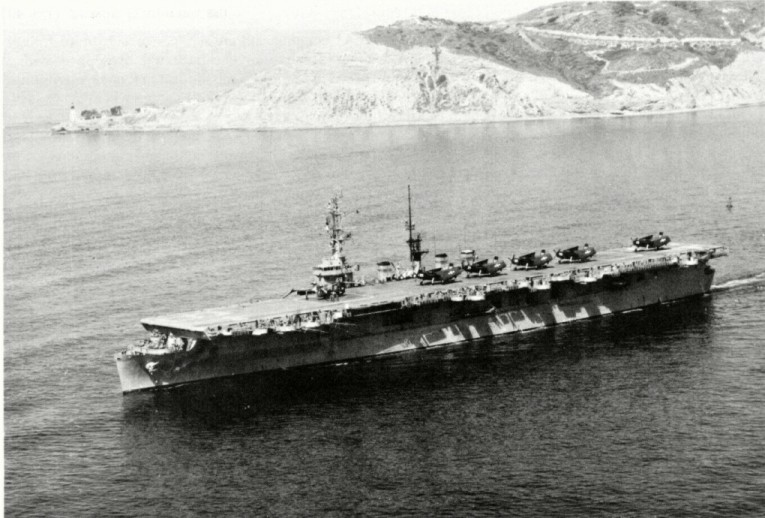
USS Wright

- 9 February – USS Wright commissioned.
- 11 February – USS Cabot, USS Monterey, USS Langley, and USS Bataan decommissioned, placed in reserve.
- 17 February – USS Lake Champlain, USS Enterprise, USS Franklin, and USS Wasp decommissioned, placed in reserve.
- 1 March – USS San Jacinto decommissioned, placed in reserve.
- 22 March – USS Intrepid decommissioned, placed in reserve.
- April – HMS Venerable decommissioned, placed in reserve.
- 22 April – HMS Centaur launched.
- 23 April – USS Lexington decommissioned, placed in reserve.
- 30 April – Hōshō sold for scrap.
- 6 May – HMS Albion launched.
- 9 May – USS Hancock decommissioned, placed in reserve.
- 16 August – Graf Zeppelin sunk in target practice by the Soviet Union.
- 12 August – USS Oriskany construction suspended.

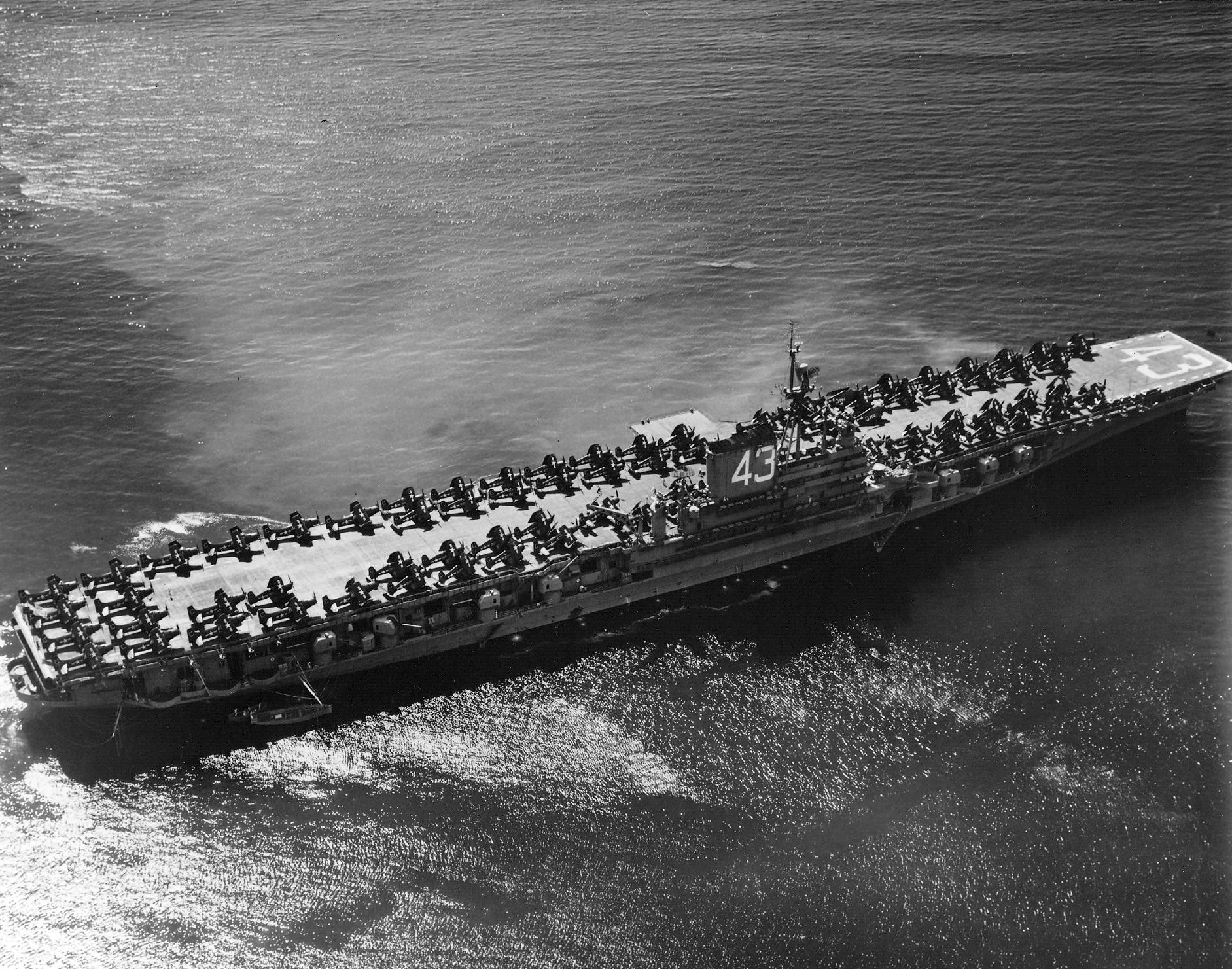
USS Coral Sea

- 1 October – USS Coral Sea commissioned.
- 7 November – USS Shangri-La decommissioned, placed in reserve.

1948

- January – HMS Furious sold for scrap.
- 25 February – USS Randolph decommissioned, placed in reserve.
- 21 March – HMS Magnificent loaned to Canada and commissioned as HMCS Magnificent.
- 23 March – HMS Warrior returned to UK.
- May – HMS Venerable sold to Netherlands.
- 28 May – HMS Venerable recommissioned as HNLMS Karel Doorman.
- 20 June – USS Princeton decommissioned, placed in reserve.
- 22 June – HMS Bulwark launched.
- 24 June – Soviet blockade of Berlin increased tensions in what would become the Cold War between NATO-allied nations and the Warsaw Pact.
- 27 October – USS Cabot recommissioned.
- November – HMS Warrior recommissioned, fitted with a rubber deck for trials.
- 16 December – HMS Terrible commissioned as HMAS Sydney.

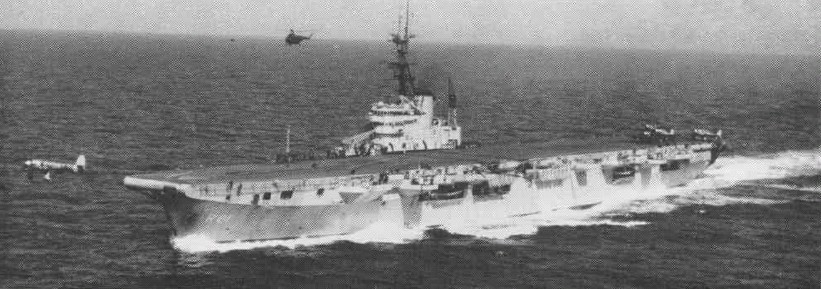
Dutch carrier HNLMS Karel Doorman (R81) launching a Hawker Sea Fury in the mid-1950s

1949

- HMS Unicorn recommissioned as transport carrier.
- Dixmude converted for use as a transport.
- 18 April – USS United States laid down.
- 4 April – NATO alliance formed.
- 23 April – USS United States cancelled.
- 21 June – USS Antietam decommissioned, placed in reserve.
- 30 June – USS Tarawa decommissioned, placed in reserve.
- 2 August – USS Reprisal (incomplete) sold for scrap.

== 1950–1959 ==
1950

- HMS Indomitable recommissioned; HMS Indefatigable recommissioned as a training ship.
- 3 May – HMS Ark Royal launched.
- 13 May – USS Bataan recommissioned.
- June – USS Oriskany construction resumed.
- 16 June – USS Kearsarge decommissioned, taken in hand for modernisation.
- 25 June – Korean War begins.
- 28 August – USS Princeton recommissioned.
- 15 September – USS Monterey recommissioned.
- 25 September – USS Oriskany commissioned.

1951

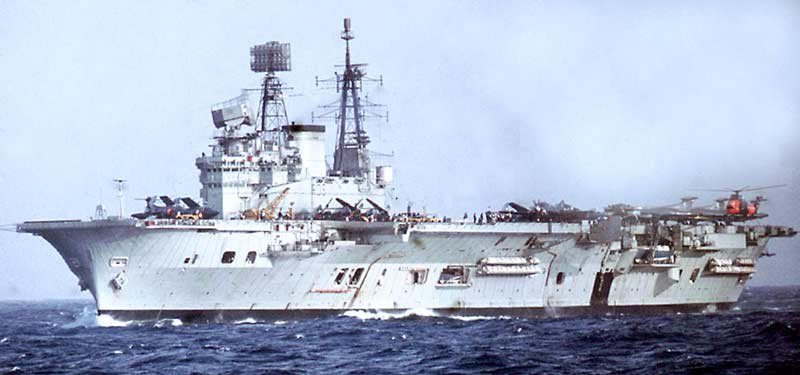
HMS Eagle

- Aquila sold for scrap
- Arromanches purchased by France.
- January – USS Langley loaned to France.
- 15 January – USS Bon Homme Richard recommissioned.
- 16 January – USS Essex recommissioned.
- 17 January – USS Antietam recommissioned.
- 29 January – USS Independence sunk in weapons tests.
- 3 February – USS Tarawa recommissioned.
- 20 March – USS Hornet recommissioned.
- 10 May – USS Shangri-La recommissioned.
- 12 May – USS Hornet decommissioned for conversion to CVA.
- 6 June – USS Langley recommissioned as La Fayette.
- July – First trials of a steam catapult, on HMS Perseus.
- 31 July – HMS Vidal launched, first small ship designed to carry a helicopter.
- 10 September – USS Wasp recommissioned as CVA.
- 1 October – HMS Eagle commissioned.

1952

- First trial of angled flight deck, on HMS Triumph.
- First trial of mirror landing aid, on HMS Illustrious.
- 9 February – USS Intrepid recommissioned.
- 15 February – USS Kearsarge recommissioned.
- 31 January – USS Ticonderoga recommissioned.
- 4 April – USS Ticonderoga decommissioned for conversion to CVA.
- 9 April – USS Intrepid decommissioned for conversion to CVA.
- 23 April – HMS Powerful sold to Canada, work recommenced.
- 14 July – USS Forrestal laid down.
- 19 September – USS Lake Champlain recommissioned.
- October – USS Boxer reclassified CVA.
- 13 November – HMS Vengeance loaned to Australia, recommissioned as HMAS Vengeance; USS Bennington recommissioned as CVA.
- 14 November – USS Shangri-La decommissioned for modernisation.
- 16 December – USS Saratoga laid down.

1953

- HMS Formidable sold for scrap.
- HMS Unicorn decommissioned, placed in reserve.
- 16 February – HMS Hermes launched.
- 20 February – USS Yorktown recommissioned.
- May – HMS Indomitable sold for scrap.
- 15 May – USS Bon Homme Richard decommissioned, commenced extensive refit.
- 1 July – USS Randolph recommissioned.
- 27 July – Korean War fighting ends with the Korean armistice agreement.
- 1 September – HMS Centaur launched.
- 5 September – USS Belleau Wood loaned to France.

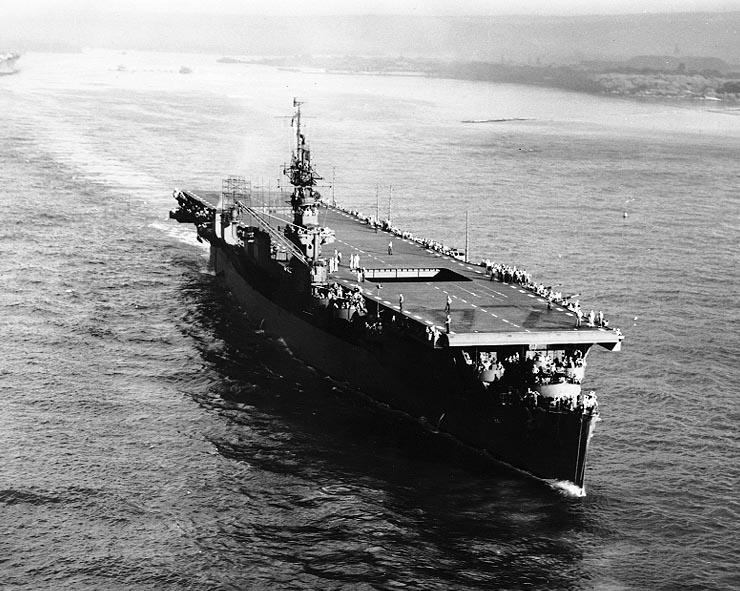
USS Belleau Wood

- 5 September – USS Belleau Wood recommissioned as Bois Belleau.
- 11 September – USS Hornet recommissioned.

1954

- HMS Perseus decommissioned, placed in reserve.
- Mid-1954 – HMS Implacable and HMS Indefatigable decommissioned.
- 15 February – USS Hancock recommissioned as CVA.
- 9 April – USS Bataan decommissioned, placed in reserve.
- 23 April – USS Franklin D. Roosevelt decommissioned for modernisation.
- 26 May – HMS Albion commissioned.
- 18 June – USS Intrepid recommissioned in reserve.
- 1 August – First Indochina War ends.
- 2 August – USS Ranger laid down.
- September – HMS Pioneer decommissioned and sold for scrap;
- 11 September – USS Ticonderoga recommissioned after modernisation.

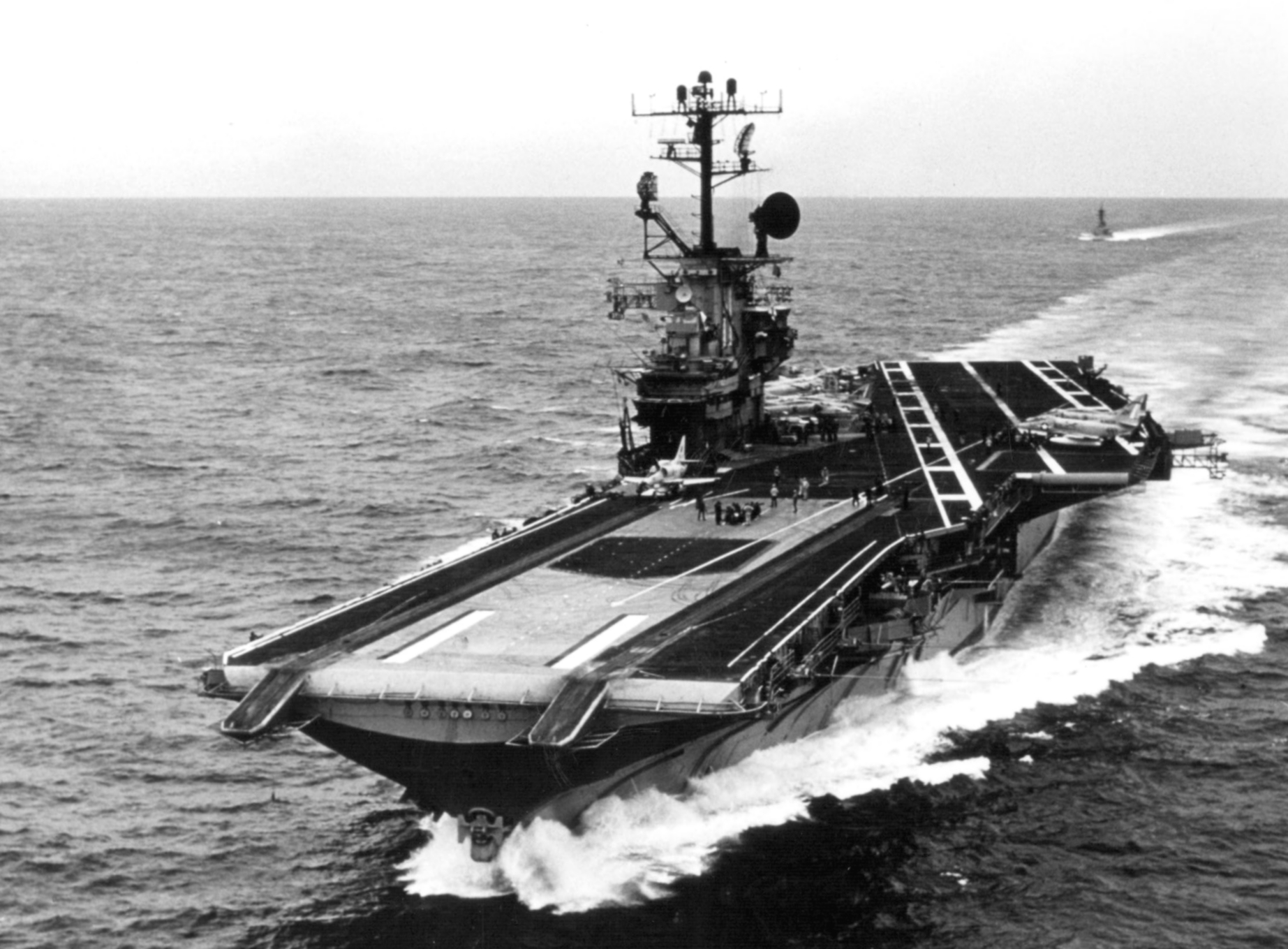
USS Intrepid

- 15 October – USS Intrepid returned to full commission.
- 4 November – HMS Bulwark commissioned.
- December – HMS Illustrious decommissioned.
- 11 December – USS Forrestal launched.

1955

- 10 January – USS Shangri-La recommissioned.
- 21 January – USS Cabot decommissioned, placed in reserve.
- 25 February – HMS Ark Royal (R09) commissioned, incorporating an angled flight deck, two steam catapults, and a mirror landing system.
- 6 April – USS Franklin D. Roosevelt recommissioned with angled flight deck, steam catapult and hurricane bow.
- 14 May – Warsaw Pact formed.
- July – USS Midway decommissioned for modernisation.
- 1 July – USS Independence laid down.
- 13 August – HMS Vengeance returned to UK.
- 15 August – USS Lexington recommissioned as CVA.
- 6 September – USS Bon Homme Richard recommissioned.
- 29 September – USS Forrestal commissioned.
- 8 October – USS Saratoga launched.
- 25 October – HMAS Vengeance decommissioned.
- 26 October – HMS Majestic christened as HMAS Majestic.

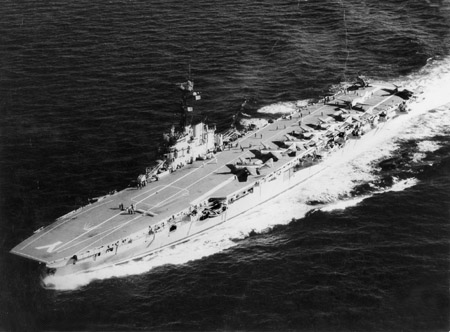
Australian carrier HMAS Melbourne

- 28 October – HMAS Majestic renamed and commissioned as HMAS Melbourne; HMS Vengeance recommissioned in reserve.
- November – HMS Implacable sold for scrap.
- 1 November – Clemenceau (France) laid down.
- 15 November – USS Boxer reclassified as CVS.

1956

- HMS Indefatigable sold for scrap.
- HMS Glory decommissioned, placed in reserve.
- 16 January – USS Monterey decommissioned, placed in reserve.
- 15 March – USS Wright decommissioned, placed in reserve.
- 13 April – USS Hancock decommissioned.
- 14 April – USS Saratoga commissioned.
- 26 September – USS Ranger launched.
- 29 October – Suez Crisis begins.
- 3 November – HMS Illustrious sold for scrap.
- 15 November – USS Hancock recommissioned.

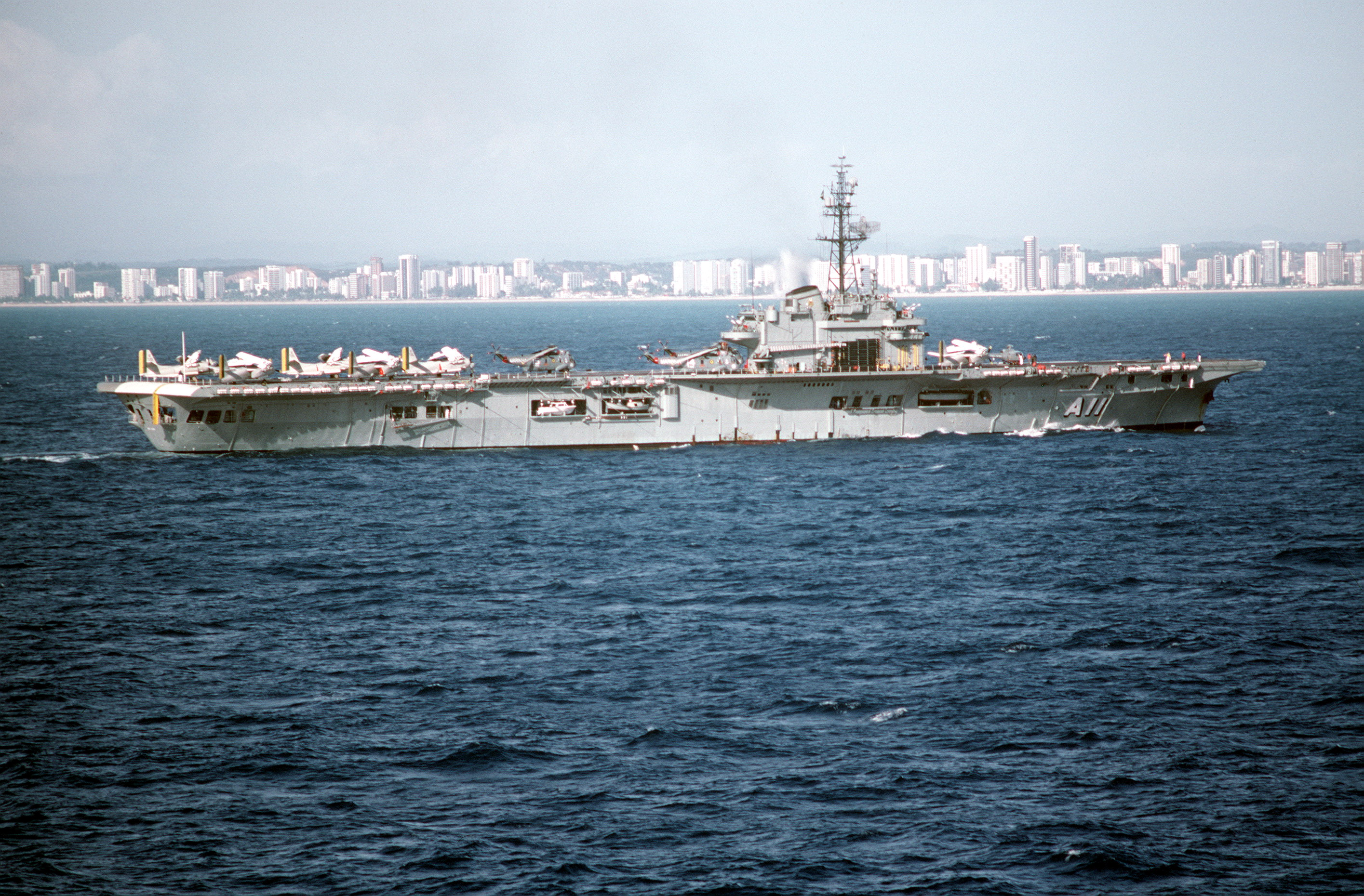
Brazilian carrier NAeL Minas Gerais

- 14 December – HMS Vengeance sold to Brazil.
- 27 December – USS Kitty Hawk laid down.

1957

- HMS Theseus decommissioned, placed in reserve.
- January – HMS Hercules sold to India, construction restarted.
- 2 January – USS Oriskany decommissioned, started modernisation.
- 17 January – HMS Powerful commissioned as HMCS Bonaventure.
- 15 February – Foch (France) laid down.
- 24 May – USS Coral Sea decommissioned for modernisation.
- 14 June – HMCS Magnificent returned to UK and placed in reserve as HMS Magnificent.

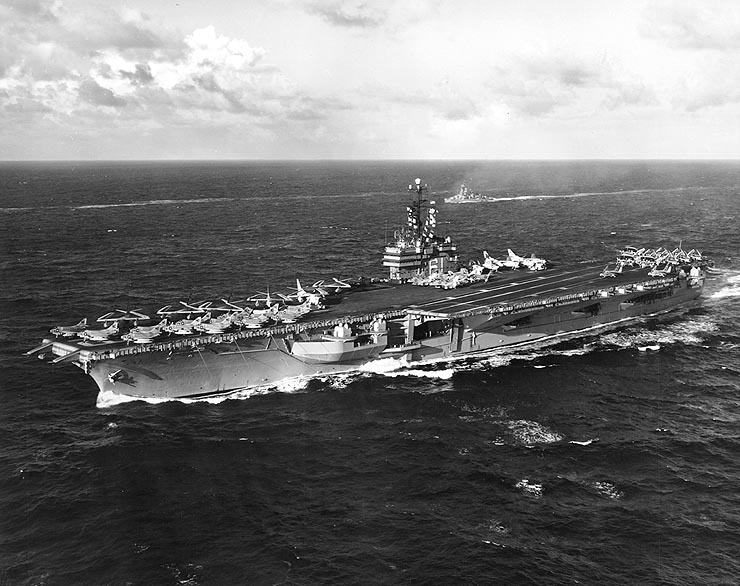
USS Ranger

- 10 August – USS Ranger commissioned.
- 14 September – USS Constellation laid down.
- 30 September – USS Midway recommissioned.
- 3 October – USS Saipan decommissioned, placed in reserve.
- 5 December – HMS Ocean decommissioned, placed in reserve.
- 21 December – Clemenceau launched.

1958

- HMS Perseus and HMS Ocean sold for scrap.
- February – HMS Warrior decommissioned.
- 4 February – USS Enterprise laid down.
- 30 May – HMAS Sydney decommissioned, held in reserve.
- 6 June – USS Independence launched.
- 1 July – USS Enterprise (Yorktown class) sold for scrap.
- 4 November – Ex-HMS Warrior sold to Argentina.
- 28 December – USS Philippine Sea decommissioned, placed in reserve.

1959

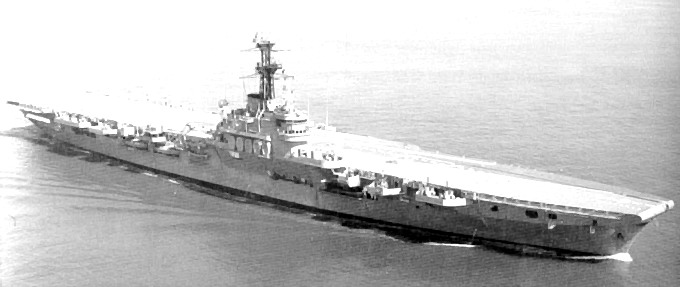
Argentine carrier ARA Independencia

- 10 January – USS Independence commissioned.
- 26 January – Ex-HMS Warrior commissioned as ARA Independencia.
- 30 January – USS Boxer reclassified LPH.
- 2 March – USS Princeton reclassified LPH.
- 7 March – USS Oriskany recommissioned.
- 15 May – USS Leyte decommissioned, placed in reserve.
- June – HMS Unicorn sold for scrap.
- 1 November – USS Cowpens sold for scrap.
- 18 November – HMS Hermes commissioned.

== 1960–1969 ==
1960

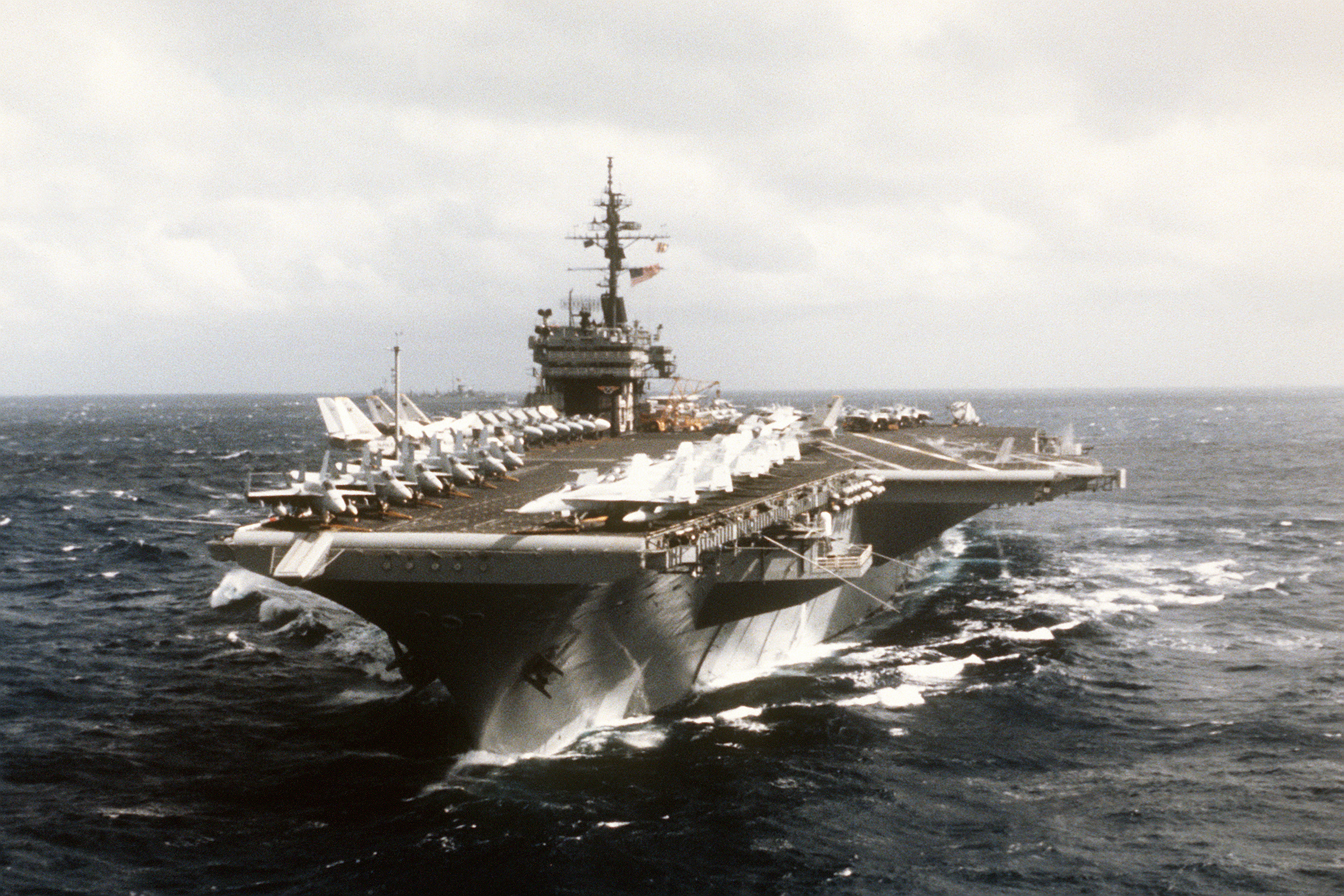
USS Constellation

- Dixmude hulked as an accommodation ship.
- HMS Ocean and HMS Theseus sold for scrap.
- 25 January – USS Coral Sea recommissioned.
- May – USS Tarawa decommissioned, placed in reserve.
- 21 May – USS Kitty Hawk launched.
- 28 July – Foch launched.
- September – Bois Belleau (USS Belleau Wood) returned to US Navy.
- 24 September – USS Enterprise launched.
- 1 October – Bois Belleau struck.
- 8 October – USS Constellation launched.
- 21 November – USS Belleau Wood sold for scrap.
- 6 December – Ex-HMS Vengeance recommissioned as NAeL Minas Gerais.

1961

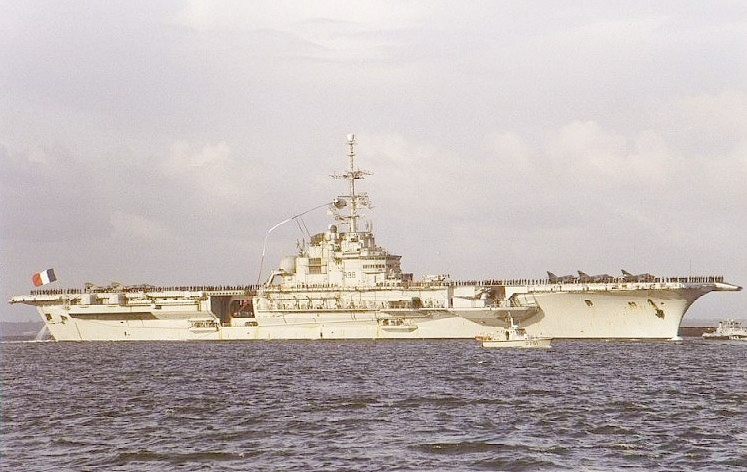
French carrier Clemenceau

- 9 January – USS America laid down.
- 4 March – HMS Hercules commissioned as INS Vikrant.
- 29 April – USS Kitty Hawk commissioned.
- May – USS Bataan sold for scrap.
- 1 July – USS Valley Forge reclassified LPH.
- 27 October – USS Constellation commissioned.
- 22 November – Clemenceau commissioned.
- 25 November – USS Enterprise commissioned; first nuclear-powered aircraft carrier.

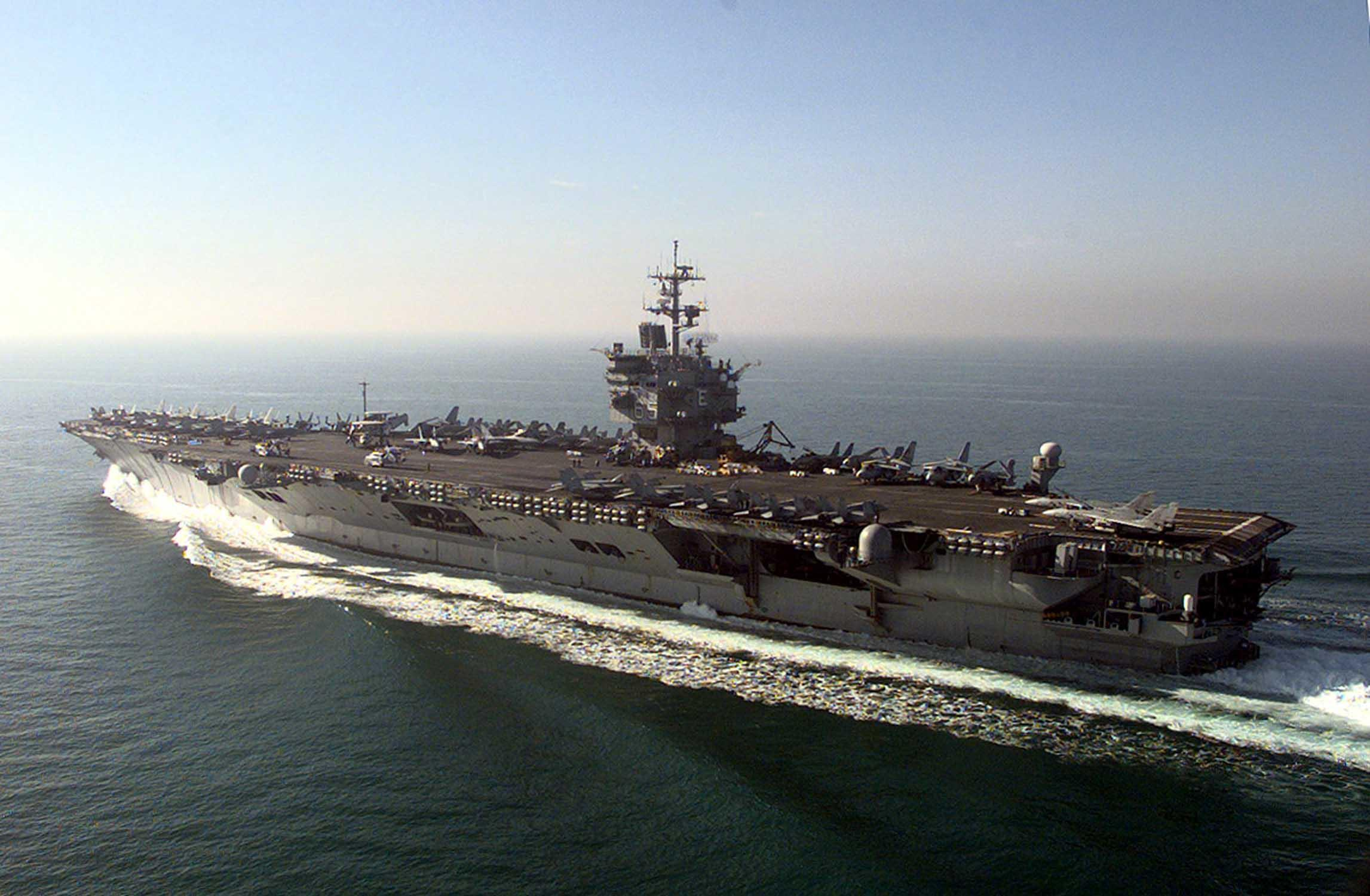
USS Enterprise

1962

- 7 March – HMAS Sydney recommissioned as fast troop carrier.
- 15 March – USS Wright conversion to command and control ship started.
- Mid 1962 – HMS Albion designated as commando carrier.
- August – Indonesia plans invasion of West New Guinea; war plans include sinking of Dutch carrier Karel Doorman using Soviet-supplied bombers with anti-ship missiles, but ceasefire ended the threat.

1963

- 7 January – USS Antietam decommissioned, placed in reserve.
- 8 February – Short Take Off and Vertical Landing (STOVL) test aircraft and pre-Harrier prototype Hawker P.1127 first operates from HMS Ark Royal.
- 15 July – Foch commissioned.
- March – La Fayette (USS Langley) returned to USN.
- March – USS Saipan conversion to communications command ship started.
- 11 May – USS Wright recommissioned as command and control ship.

1964

- 19 February – USS Langley sold for scrap.
- 1 February – USS America launched.
- 2 August – Gulf of Tonkin Incident led U.S. to greatly increase its overt role in the Vietnam War.
- 1 September – USS Saipan reclassified as Major Communications Relay Ship (AGMR).
- 22 October – USS John F. Kennedy laid down.

1965

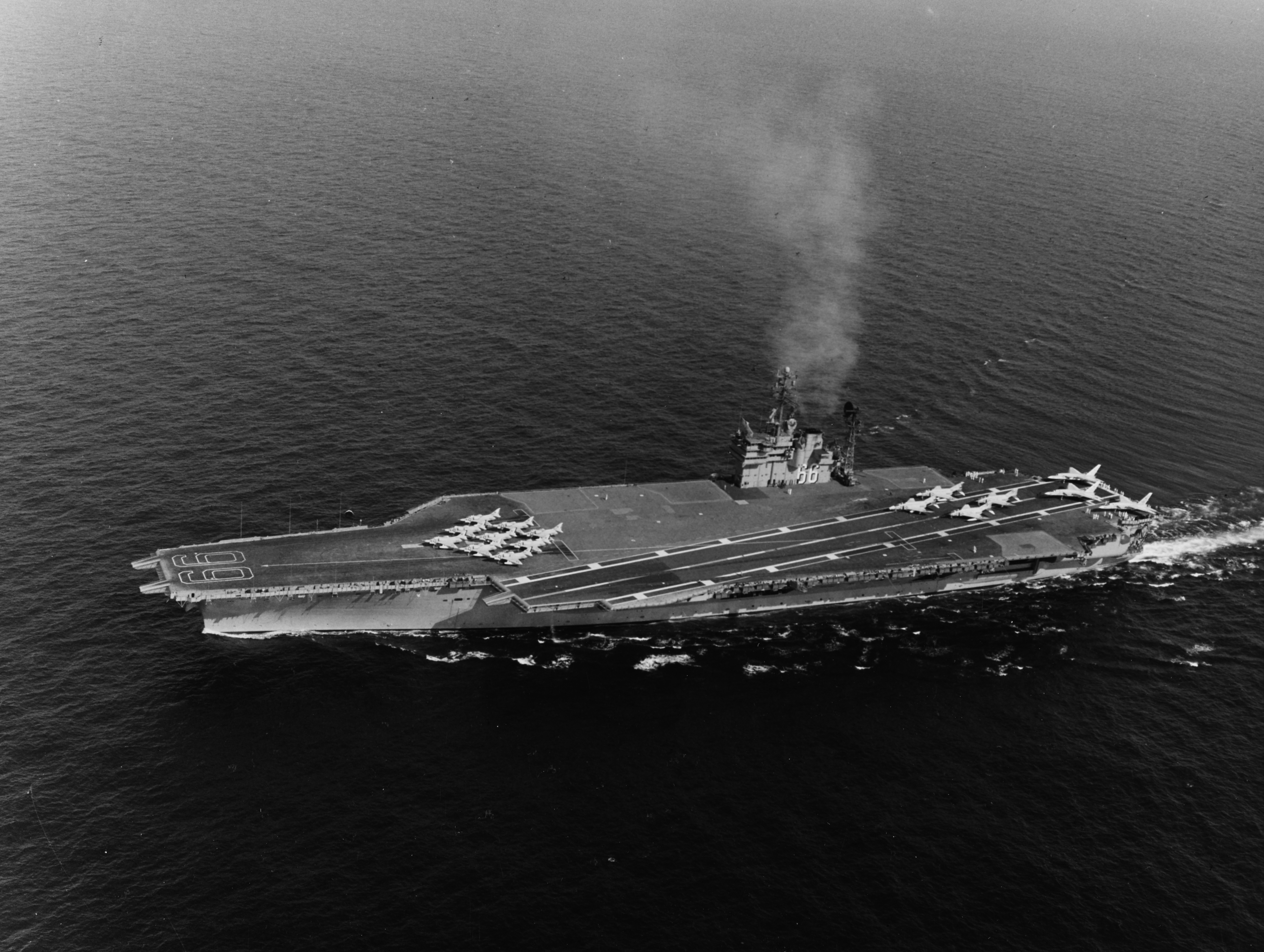
USS America

- 23 January – USS America commissioned.
- 8 April – USS Saipan renamed USS Arlington.
- July – HMS Magnificent sold for scrap.

1966

- HMS Centaur designated as depot ship.
- Béarn decommissioned.
- British 1966 Defence White Paper cancels defense projects such as CVA-01 and begins plans for phased end to UK carrier aviation.
- Dixmude returned to U.S. Navy, sunk as target.
- 15 February – USS Midway decommissioned for further modernisation.
- 2 May – USS Lake Champlain decommissioned.
- 27 July – USS Franklin sold for scrap.
- 27 August – USS Arlington recommissioned as communication relay ship.

1967

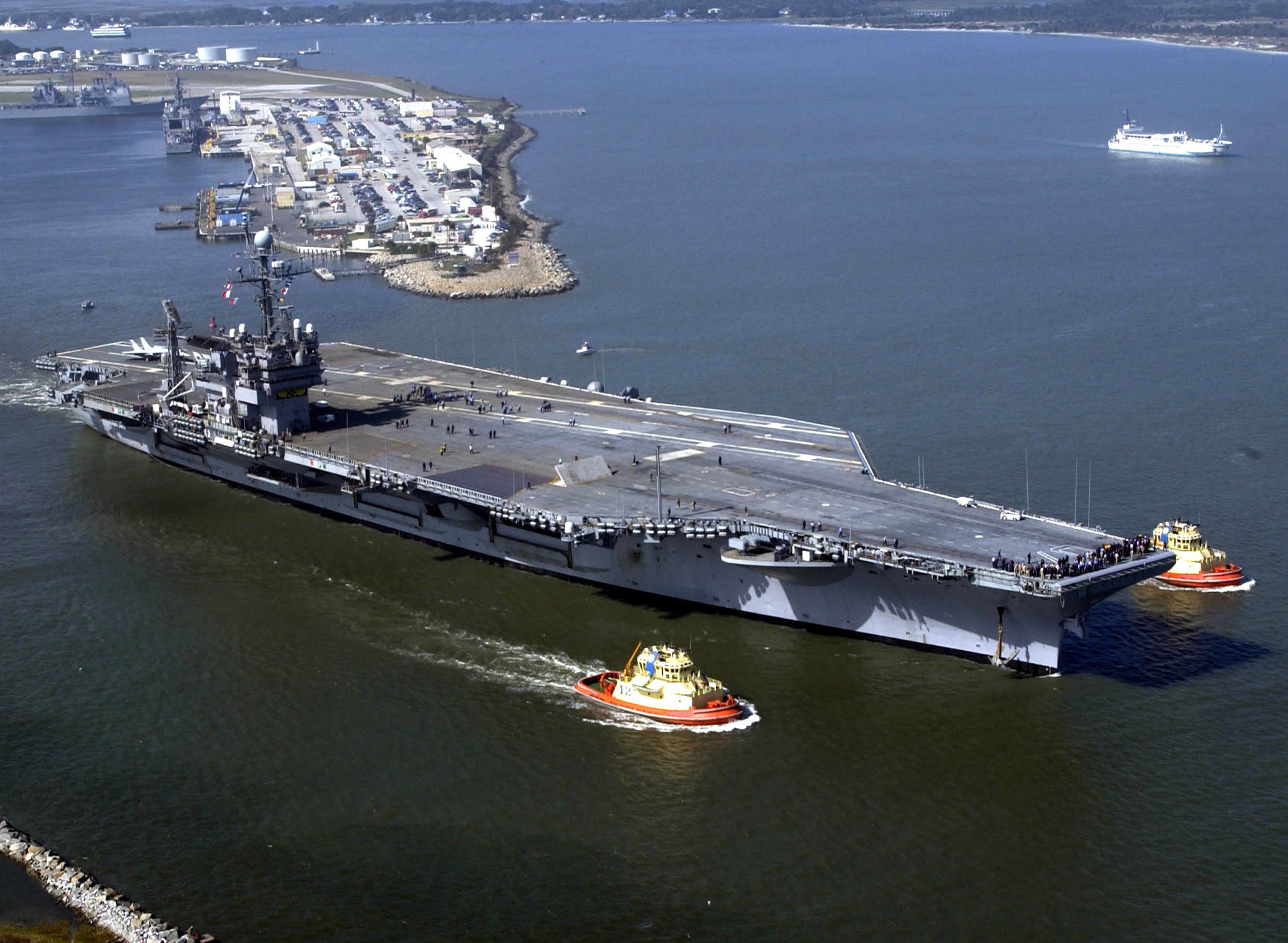
USS John F. Kennedy

- HMS Victorious decommissioned for re-fit, subsequently damaged in a minor fire leading to decision to scrap.
- 30 August – USS Cabot loaned to Spain, recommissioned as Dédalo.
- 31 March – Béarn sold for scrap.
- 27 May – USS John F. Kennedy launched.

1968

- Arromanches redesignated as a helicopter carrier.
- 26 April – HNLMS Karel Doorman decommissioned, placed in reserve, end of Dutch carrier aviation.
- 22 June – USS Nimitz laid down
- July – USS Franklin D. Roosevelt decommissioned for modernisation.
- 7 September – USS John F. Kennedy commissioned.
- 3 October – USS Tarawa sold for scrap.
- 15 October – HNLMS Karel Doorman sold to Argentina.

1969

- 1 January – USS Lexington reclassified as a training carrier (CVT).
- 13 February – USS Randolph decommissioned, placed in reserve.
- 12 March – Ex-HNLMS Karel Doorman recommissioned as ARA Veinticinco de Mayo.
- 26 May – USS Franklin D. Roosevelt recommissioned.
- 30 June – USS Essex decommissioned.
- July – HMS Victorious sold for scrap.
- 1 December – USS Boxer decommissioned; USS Philippine Sea struck.

== 1970–1979 ==
1970

- ARA Independencia decommissioned, placed in reserve.
- 14 January – USS Arlington decommissioned.
- 15 January – USS Bennington decommissioned, placed in reserve; USS Valley Forge decommissioned.
- 30 January – USS Princeton decommissioned.
- 31 January – USS Midway recommissioned.
- 13 February – USS Kearsarge decommissioned, placed in reserve.
- 27 May – USS Wright decommissioned, placed in reserve.
- 26 June – USS Hornet decommissioned, placed in reserve.
- 27 June – USS Yorktown decommissioned.
- 3 July – HMCS Bonaventure decommissioned.
- 15 August – USS Dwight D. Eisenhower laid down.
- September – Soviet aircraft carrier Kiev laid down.
- September – USS Leyte sold for scrap.

1971

- HMS Centaur decommissioned.
- March – HMCS Bonaventure sold for scrap.
- 13 March – USS Boxer sold for scrap.
- 17 March – ARA Independencia sold for scrap.
- 23 March – USS Philippine Sea sold for scrap.
- May – USS Monterey and USS Princeton sold for scrap.
- 2 July – USS Bon Homme Richard decommissioned, placed in reserve.
- 30 July – USS Shangri-La decommissioned, placed in reserve.
- 29 October – USS Valley Forge sold for scrap.
- 3 December – Indo-Pakistani War of 1971 begins. Indian carrier INS Vikrant carries out airstrikes against land and naval targets; Pakistani submarine PNS Ghazi sent to hunt the Vikrant, but sinks under mysterious circumstances.
- 15 December – USS San Jacinto sold for scrap.

1972

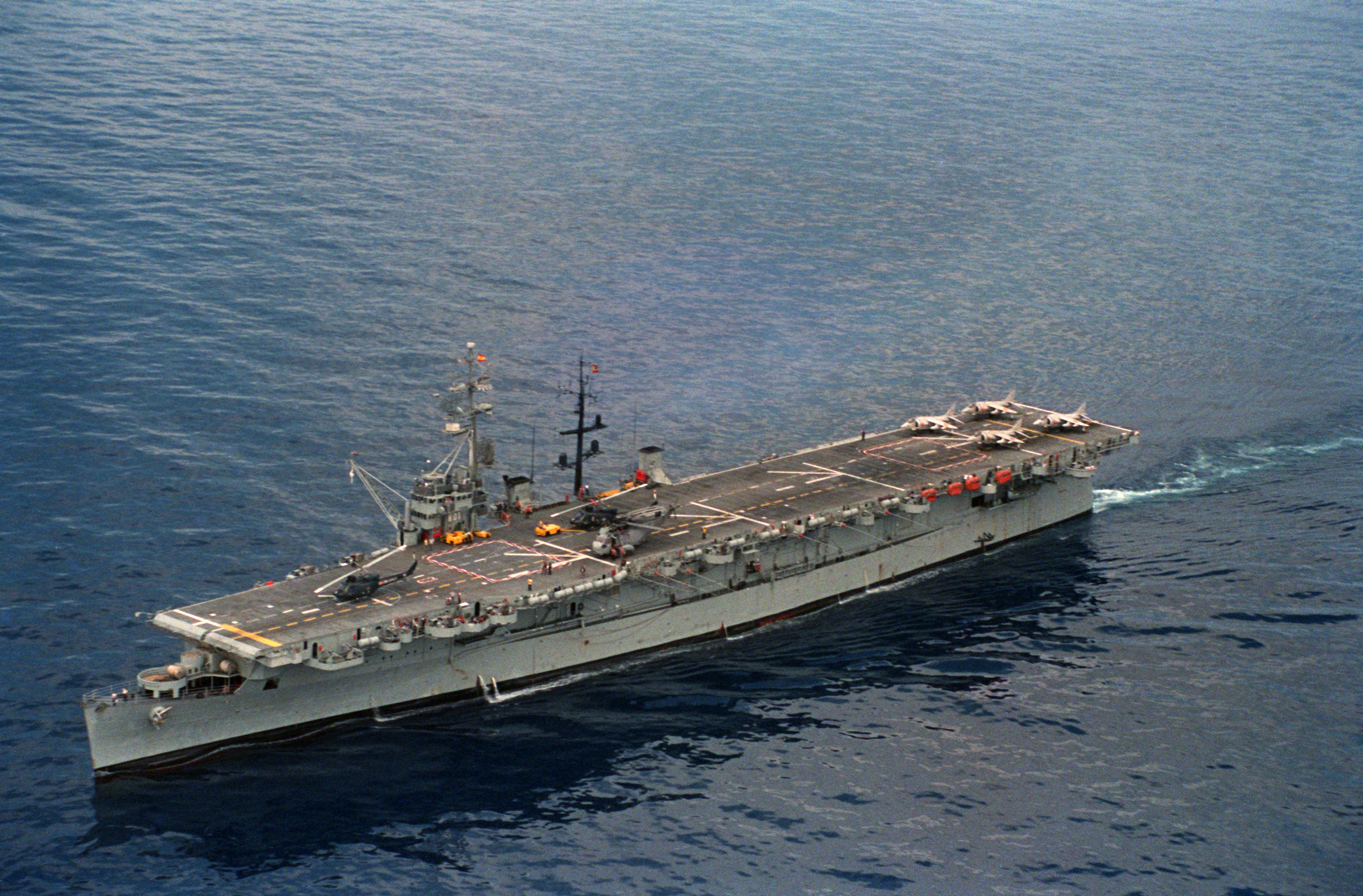
Spanish carrier Dédalo

- HMS Centaur sold for scrap.
- HMS Albion decommissioned and sold for scrap.
- 26 January – HMS Eagle decommissioned.
- 28 April – USS Lake Champlain sold for scrap.
- 13 May – USS Nimitz launched.
- 1 July – USS Wasp decommissioned.
- 5 December – Loan of Dédalo (ex-USS Cabot) to Spain converted to sale.
- December – Kiev launched, Minsk laid down.

1973

- USS Bunker Hill sold for scrap.
- 27 January – Paris Peace Accords; U.S. forces withdraw from the Vietnam War.
- 21 May – USS Wasp sold for scrap.
- 20 July – HMS Invincible laid down.
- 1 September – USS Ticonderoga decommissioned.
- 12 November – HMAS Sydney decommissioned.

1974

- 22 January – Arromanches decommissioned.
- 28 February – USS Antietam sold for scrap.
- 1 March – USS Kearsarge sold for scrap.
- 15 March – USS Intrepid decommissioned.

1975

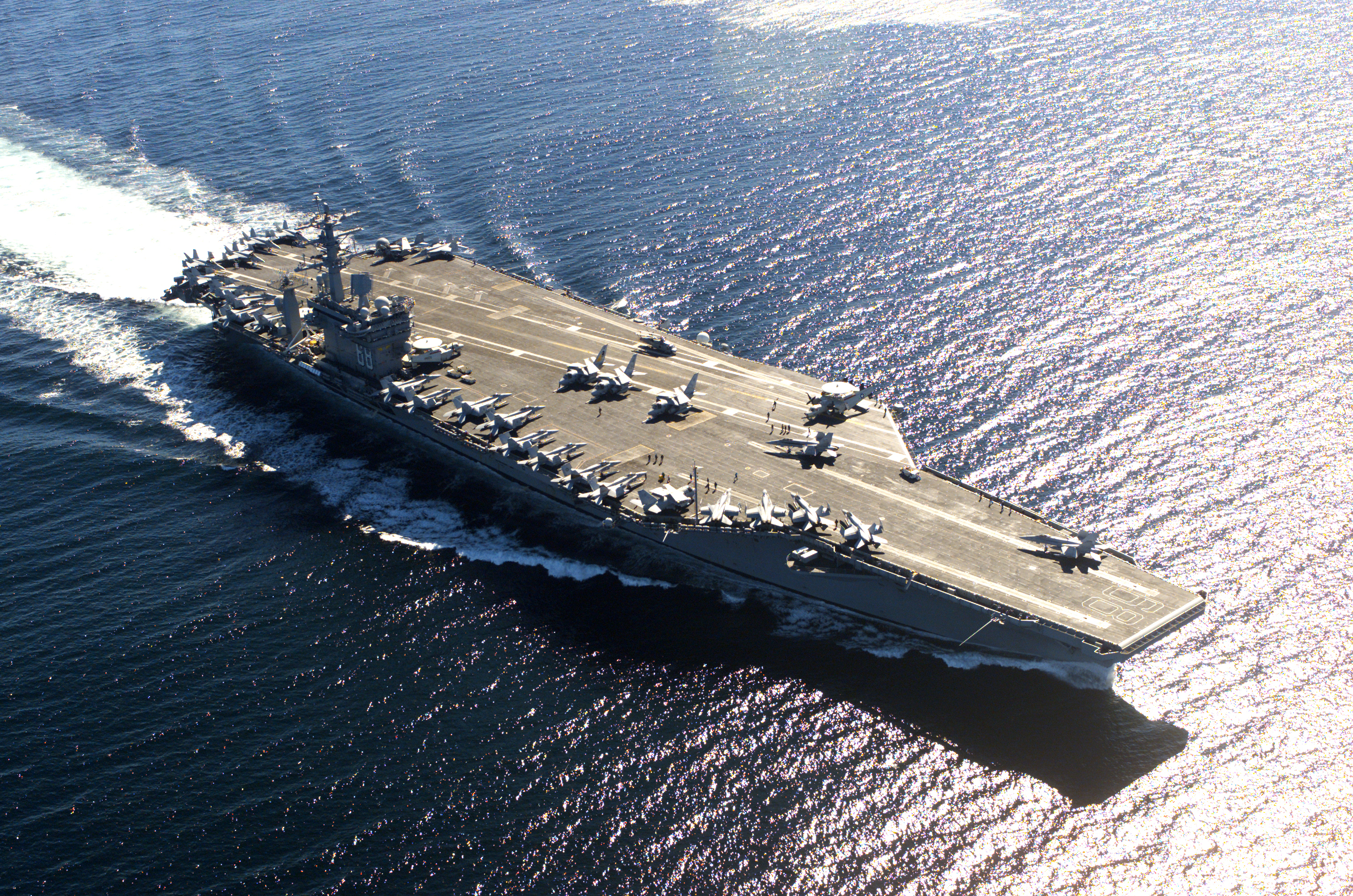
USS Nimitz

- HMS Triumph decommissioned, placed in reserve.
- 1 April – USS Randolph sold for scrap.
- May – Kiev commissioned.
- 3 May – USS Nimitz commissioned.
- 1 June – USS Essex sold for scrap.
- 1 September – USS Ticonderoga sold for scrap.
- 30 September – Minsk launched; Novorossiysk laid down.
- 11 October – USS Dwight D. Eisenhower launched; USS Carl Vinson laid down.
- 13 October – USS Yorktown preserved as museum ship.
- 28 October – HMAS Sydney sold for scrap.

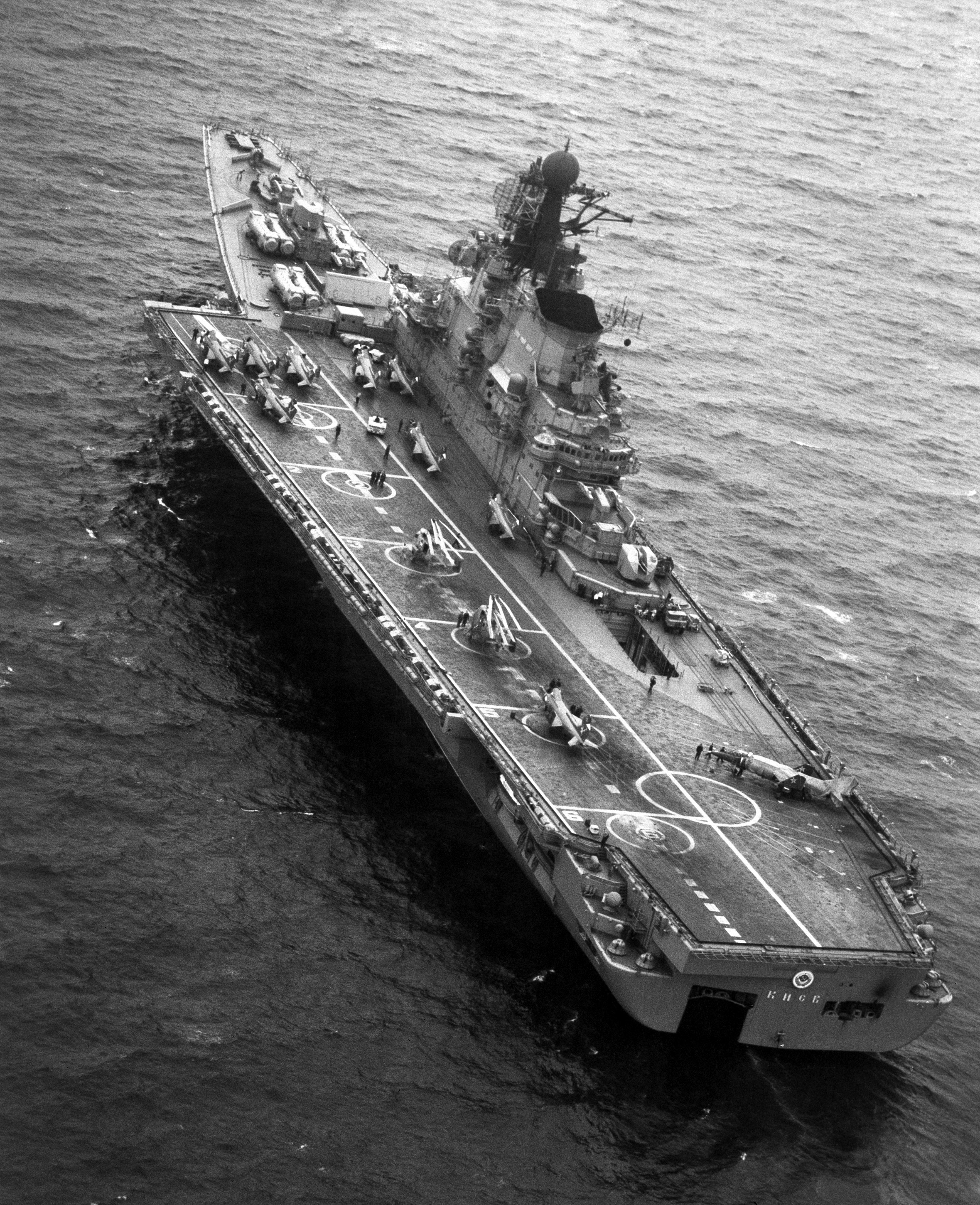
Soviet carrier Kiev

1976

- 30 January – USS Hancock decommissioned.
- March – HMS Bulwark decommissioned, placed in reserve.
- 1 June – USS Arlington sold for scrap.
- 1 September – USS Hancock sold for scrap.
- September STOVL Harriers equip Spanish aircraft carrier Dédalo, returning her to fixed-wing carrier operations; first STOVL aircraft carrier.
- 30 September – USS Oriskany decommissioned, placed in reserve.
- 7 October – HMS Illustrious laid down.

1977

- 3 May – HMS Invincible launched.
- 30 September – USS Franklin D. Roosevelt decommissioned.
- 18 October – USS Dwight D. Eisenhower commissioned.

1978

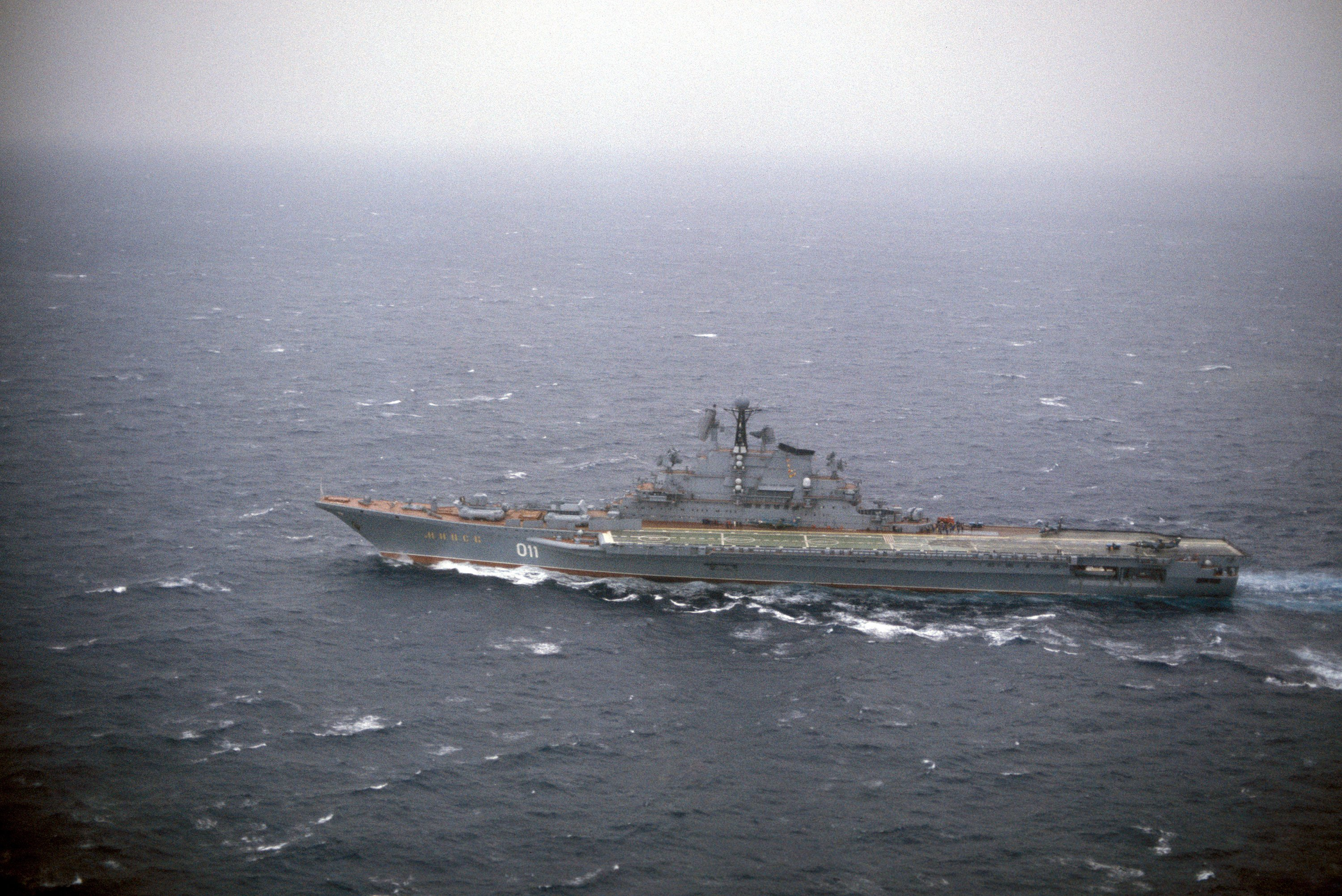
Soviet carrier Minsk

- Arromanches sold for scrap.
- 1 April – USS Franklin D. Roosevelt sold for scrap.
- 27 September – Minsk commissioned.
- 17 February – Baku laid down.
- October – HMS Eagle sold for scrap.
- 1 December – HMS Illustrious launched.
- 14 December – HMS Ark Royal (Invincible class) laid down.
- 26 December – Novorossiysk launched.

1979

- February – HMS Ark Royal (Audacious class) decommissioned; end of conventional Catapult-Assisted Take-Off But Arrested Recovery (CATOBAR) carrier operations for the UK.
- 23 February – HMS Bulwark recommissioned.
- 8 October – Príncipe de Asturias laid down.

== 1980–1989 ==
1980

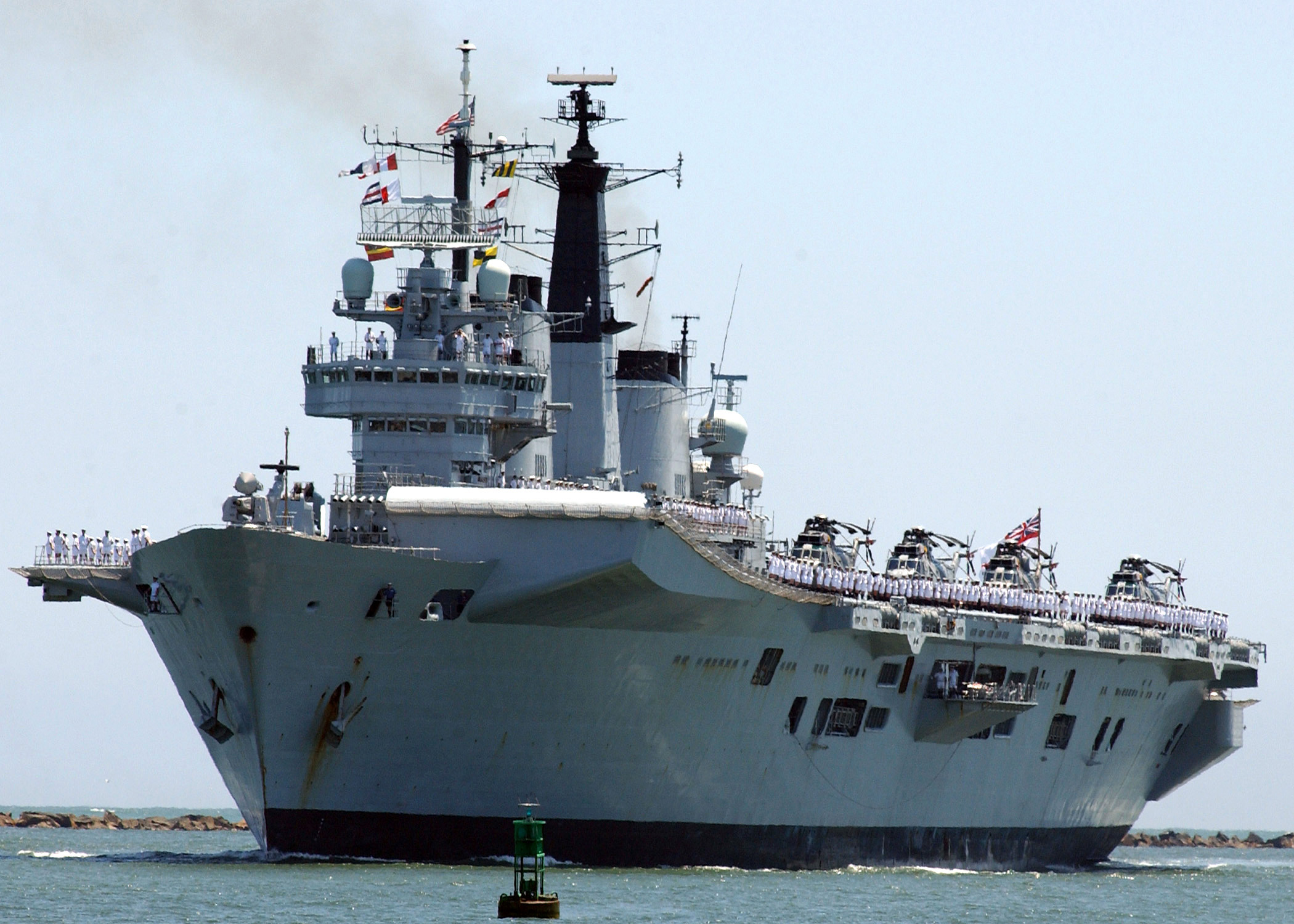
HMS Invincible

- HMS Bulwark placed in reserve.
- 15 March – USS Carl Vinson launched.
- 11 July – HMS Invincible commissioned; first purpose-built STOVL carrier, first ship to include a ski-jump ramp.
- 1 August – USS Wright sold for scrap.
- 22 September – HMS Ark Royal (Audacious class) sold for scrap.

1981

- 26 March – Giuseppe Garibaldi laid down.
- 27 March – HMS Bulwark decommissioned.
- 10 April – HMS Bulwark sold for scrap.
- 9 May – First carrier fitted with a ski jump, HMS Hermes.
- 2 June – HMS Ark Royal launched.
- 13 October – USS Theodore Roosevelt laid down.
- 9 December – HMS Triumph sold for scrap.

1982

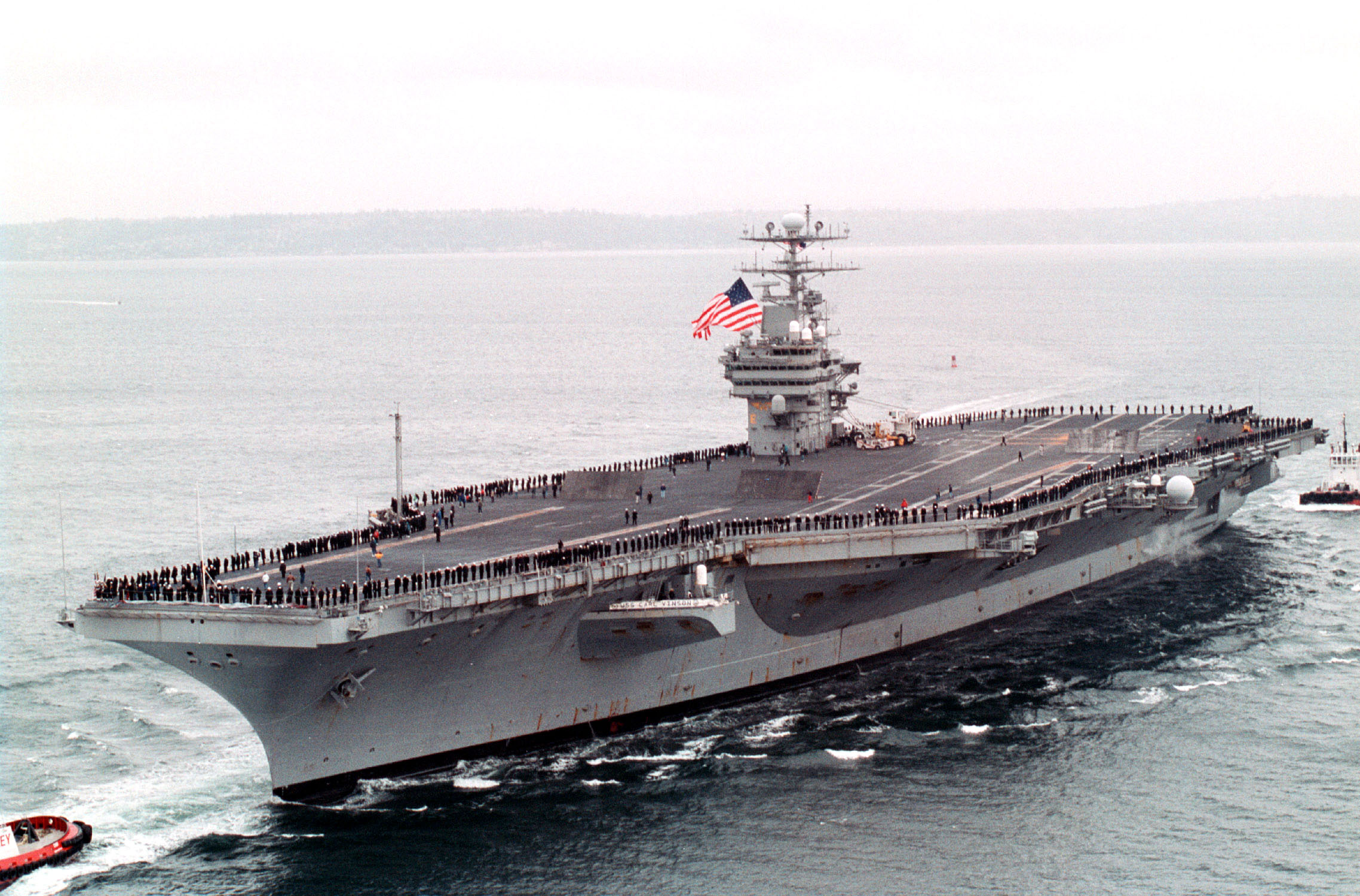
USS Carl Vinson

- 25 February – Australian government announces its intention to purchase HMS Invincible and rename it HMAS Australia.
- 13 March – USS Carl Vinson commissioned.
- 19 March – Argentina invades South Georgia, launching the Falklands War; this war provides the impetus to slow the drawdown of the Royal Navy, including carrier aviation; deal to sell HMS Invincible to Australia cancelled.
- 23 March – USS Intrepid struck, preserved as a museum ship.
- 1 April – Baku launched.
- 1 May – Argentine carrier ARA Veinticinco de Mayo detects and attempts airstrike against British fleet, but is unable to launch due to unfavorable winds.
- 2 May – Argentine cruiser ARA General Belgrano sunk by British submarine; carrier Veinticinco de Mayo withdraws to safe port for the duration of the war.
- 22 May – Príncipe de Asturias launched.
- 30 May – HMAS Melbourne decommissioned.
- 14 June – Argentine land forces in the Falkland Islands surrender, ending the conflict.
- 20 June – HMS Illustrious commissioned.
- 5 July – USS Shangri-La struck.
- September – Novorossiysk commissioned.

1983

- 22 February – Leonid Brezhnev laid down.
- 4 June – Giuseppe Garibaldi launched.

1984

- 12 April – HMS Hermes decommissioned, placed in maintained reserve.
- 27 October – USS Theodore Roosevelt launched.
- 3 November – USS Abraham Lincoln laid down.

1985

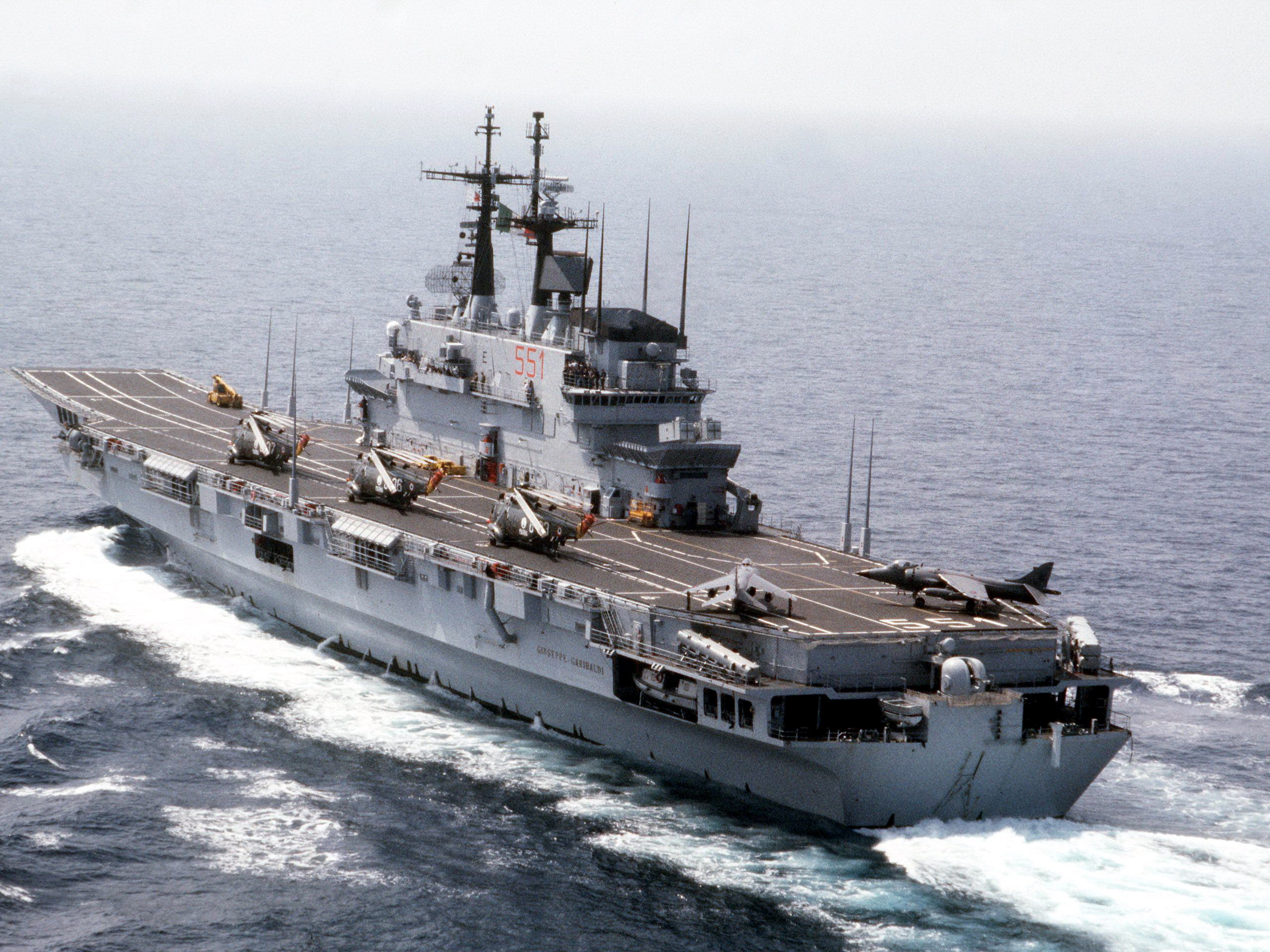
Italian carrier Giuseppe Garibaldi

- ARA Veinticinco de Mayo inoperable, laid up for possible modernisation.
- HMAS Melbourne sold for scrap.
- 30 September – Giuseppe Garibaldi commissioned as helicopter anti-submarine warfare carrier.
- 1 November – HMS Ark Royal commissioned.
- 5 December – Leonid Brezhnev launched.
- 10 December – Riga laid down.

1986

- April – HMS Hermes sold to India.
- 15 April – U.S. 1986 Bombing of Libya by carrier- and land-based aircraft.
- 25 August – USS George Washington laid down.
- 25 October – USS Theodore Roosevelt commissioned.

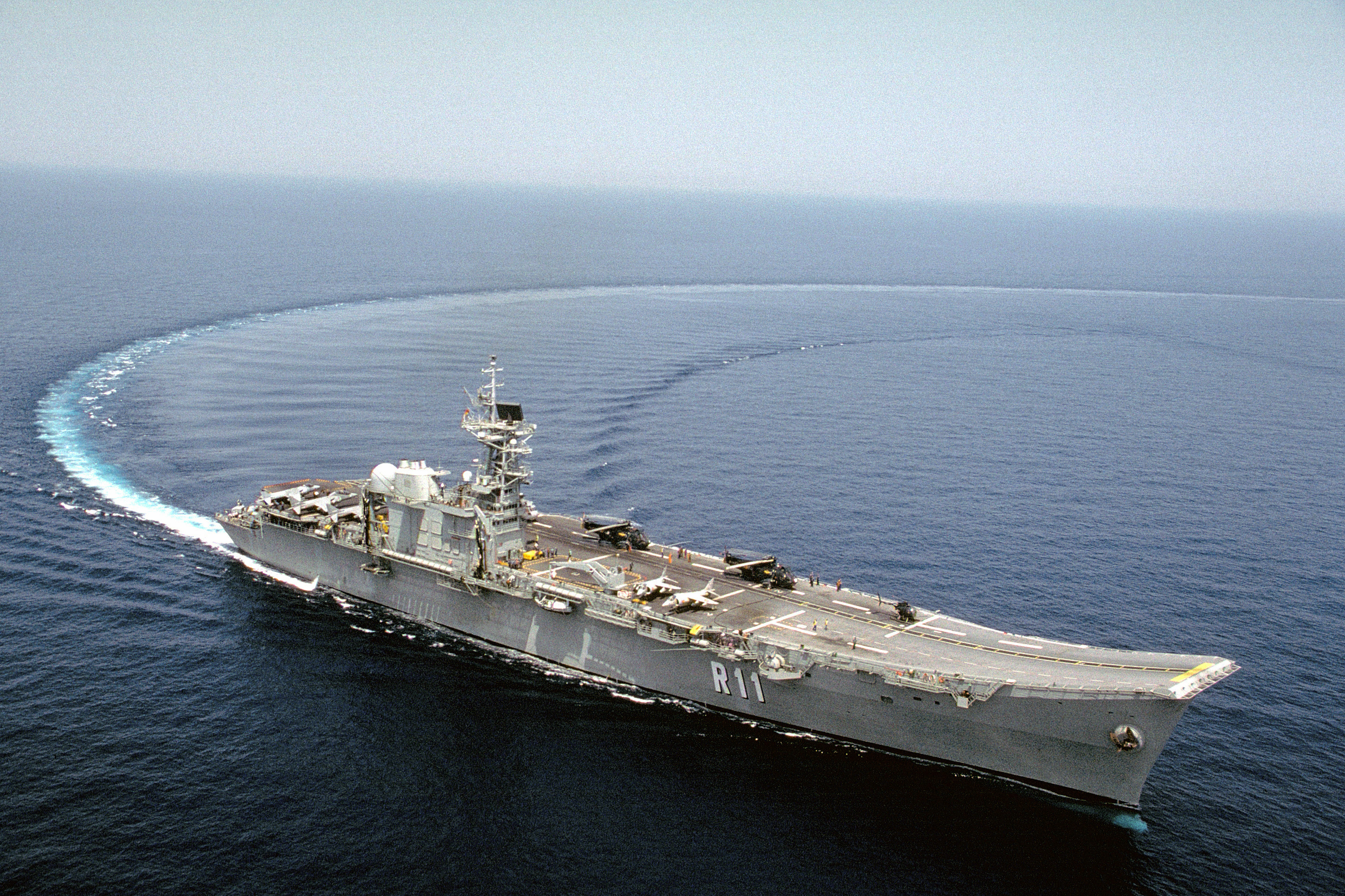
Spanish carrier Príncipe de Asturias

1987

- 11 December – Baku commissioned.

1988

- 13 February – USS Abraham Lincoln launched.
- 30 May – Príncipe de Asturias commissioned.
- 9 August – USS Shangri-La sold for scrap.
- October – Leonid Brezhnev renamed Tbilisi.
- December – Ulyanovsk laid down.
- 4 December – Riga launched.

1989

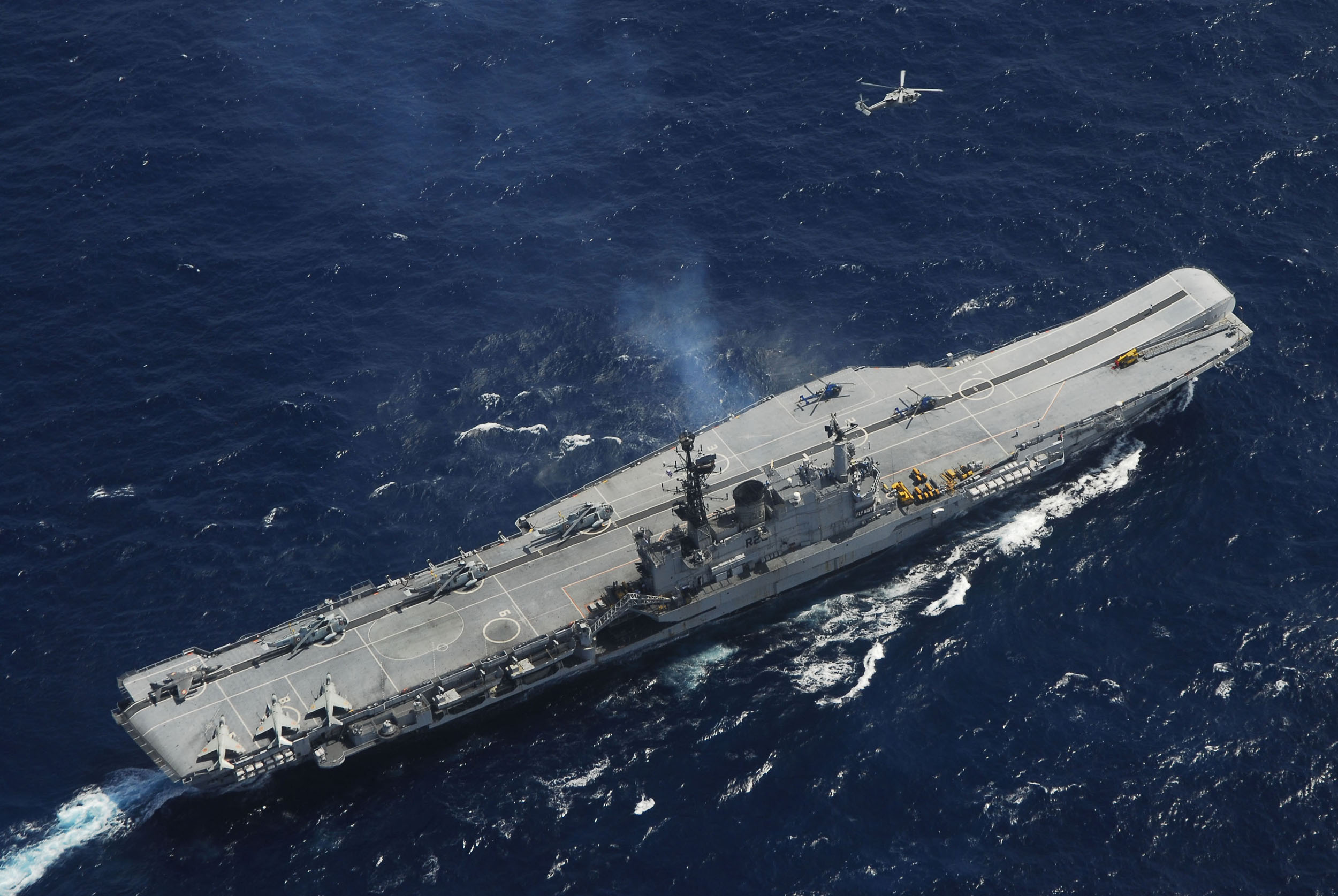
Indian carrier INS Viraat

- Giuseppe Garibaldi takes on Harrier aircraft, initiating Italian fixed-wing carrier operations.
- INS Vikrant ends CATOBAR operations and is converted with ski jump to all-STOVL operations.
- 14 April – Charles de Gaulle laid down; first non-U.S. nuclear aircraft carrier.
- 20 May – Ex-HMS Hermes commissioned as INS Viraat.
- 25 July – USS Hornet struck, preserved as a museum ship; USS Oriskany struck to be preserved as a museum ship or scrapped.
- 5 August – Dédalo decommissioned.
- 20 September – USS Bon Homme Richard and USS Bennington struck.
- 11 November – USS Abraham Lincoln commissioned.

== 1990–1999 ==
1990

- Riga renamed Varyag.
- 30 April – USS Coral Sea decommissioned.
- 21 July – USS George Washington launched.
- 2 August – Gulf War begins with Iraq invading Kuwait.
- 4 October – Tbilisi renamed Admiral Kuznetsov.

1991

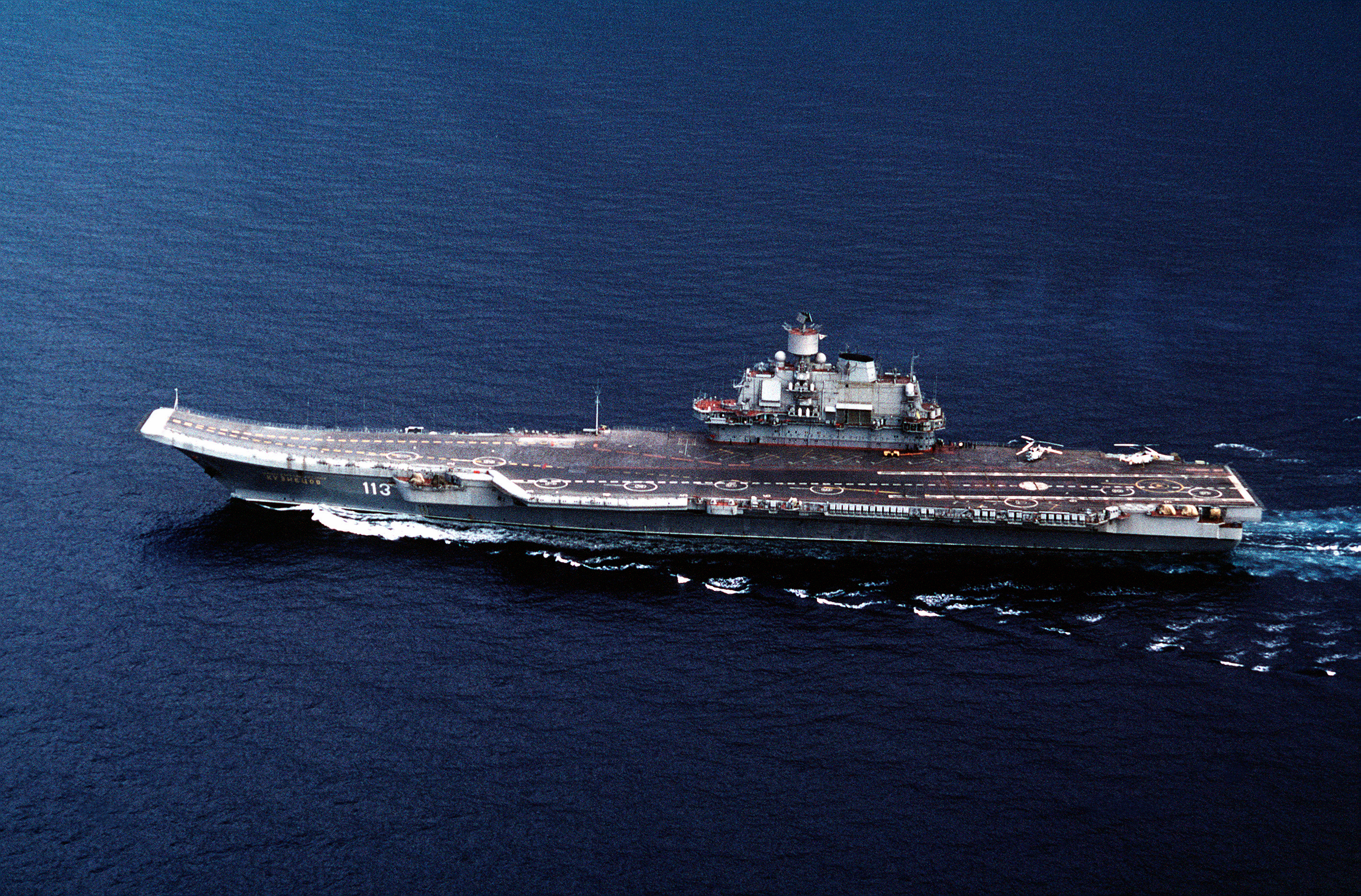
Russian carrier Admiral Kuznetsov

- Baku renamed Admiral Gorshkov.
- 21 January – Admiral Kuznetsov commissioned.
- 28 February – Gulf War ends with ceasefire.
- 13 March – USS John C. Stennis laid down.
- 1 November – Ulyanovsk cancelled at 40% complete.
- 8 November – USS Lexington decommissioned.
- 25 December – Soviet Union dissolves, Cold War ends

1992

- Construction of Varyag stopped, transferred to Ukraine.
- 4 February – Ulyanovsk scrapped; USS Bon Homme Richard sold for scrap.
- 11 April – USS Midway decommissioned, preserved as a museum ship.
- 15 June – USS Lexington donated as a museum ship.
- 4 July – USS George Washington commissioned.
- September – Novorossiysk laid up in reserve.

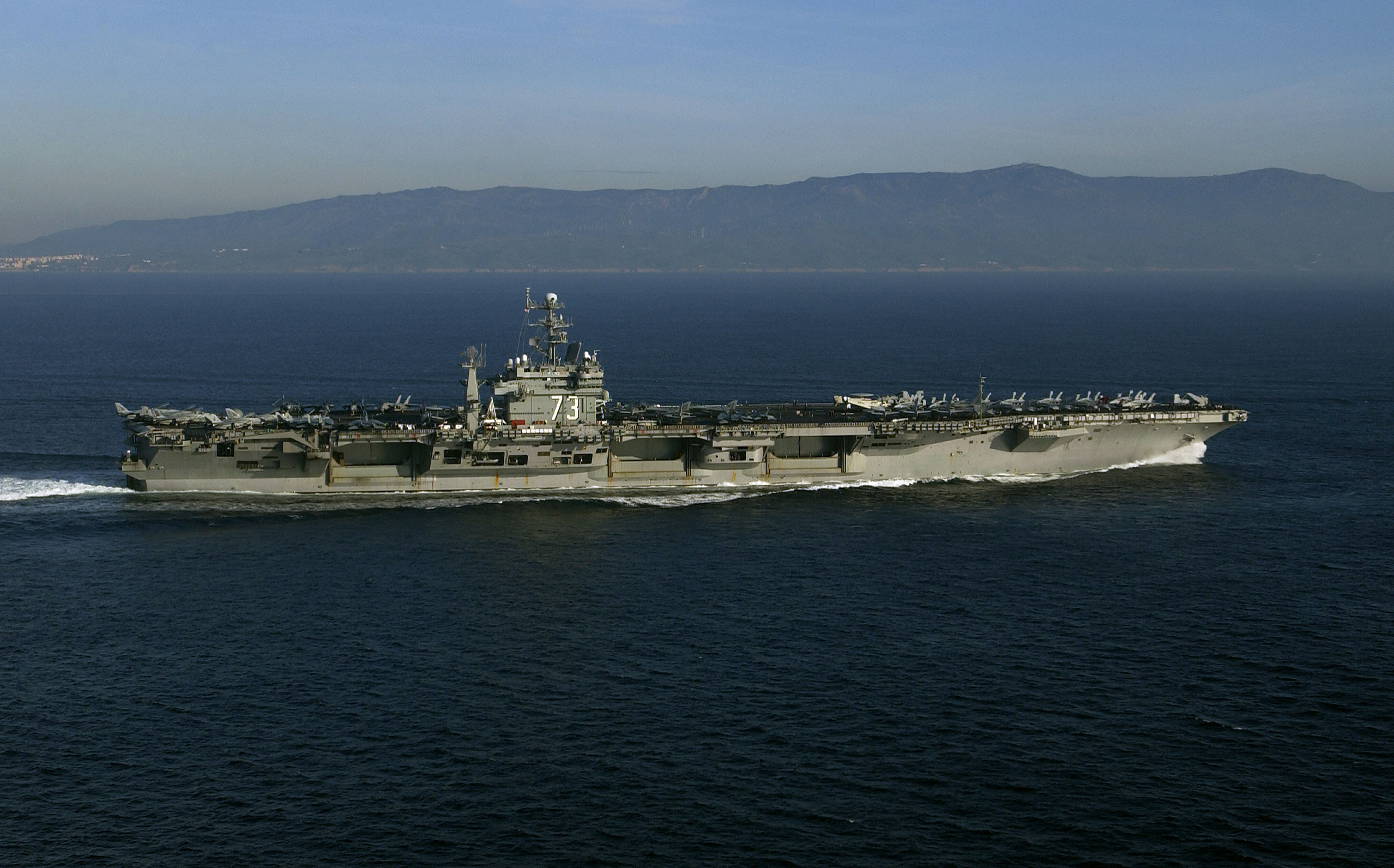
USS George Washington

1993

- 7 May – USS Coral Sea sold for scrap.
- 30 June – Kiev, Minsk and Novorossiysk decommissioned.
- 10 July – USS Ranger decommissioned, on donation hold as of 2004.
- 11 September – USS Forrestal decommissioned, on donation hold.
- 13 November – USS John C. Stennis launched.
- 29 November – USS Harry S. Truman laid down.

1994

- 1 December – USS Bennington sold for scrap.
- 7 May – Charles de Gaulle launched.
- 12 July – HTMS Chakri Naruebet laid down.
- 20 August – USS Saratoga decommissioned.

1995

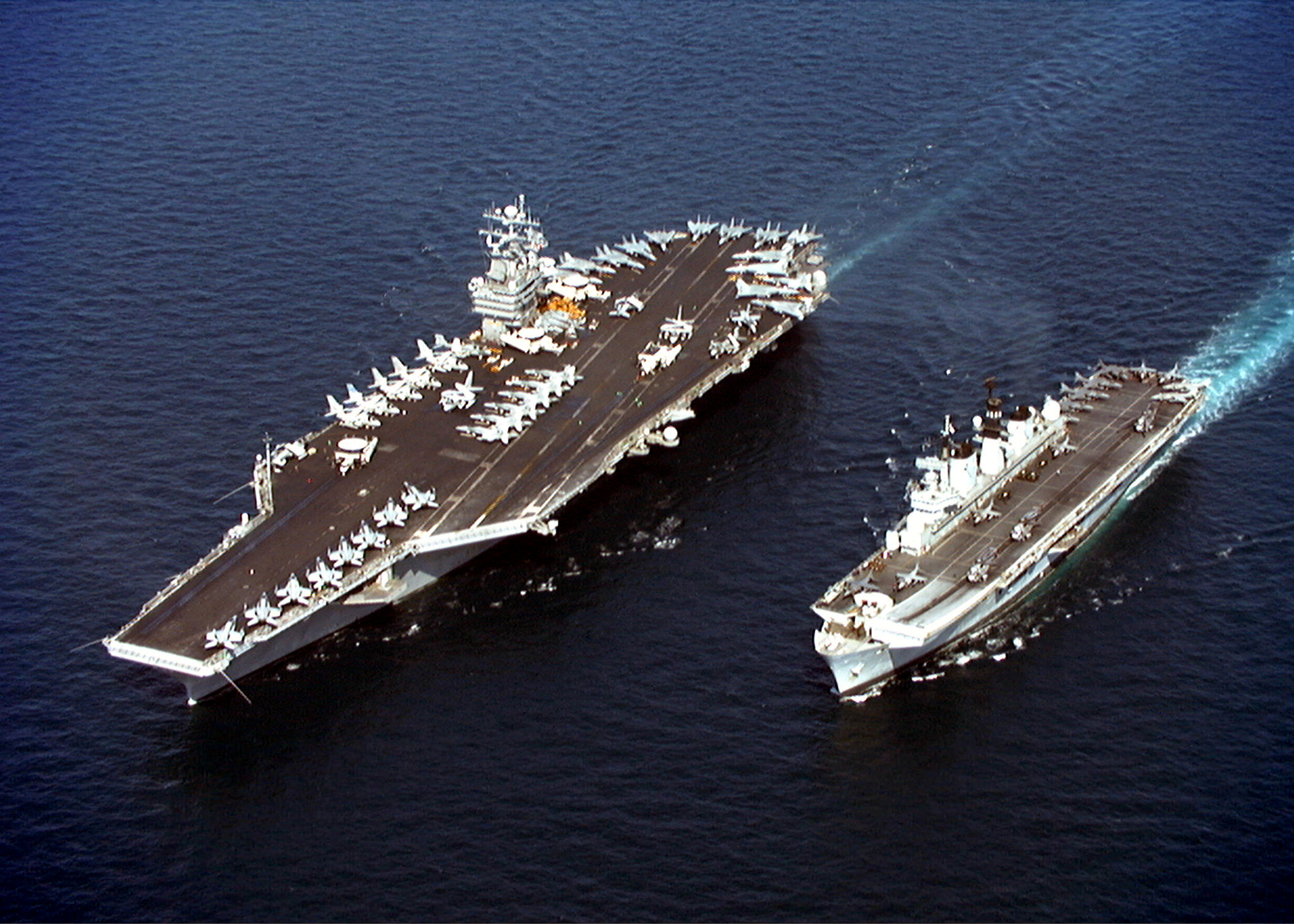
USS John C. Stennis (left) and HMS Illustrious (right)

- 1 August – Novorossiysk and Minsk sold for scrap, Minsk not scrapped.
- 9 September – USS Oriskany sold for scrap, not scrapped.
- 10 October – HMS Ocean launched.
- 9 December – USS John C. Stennis commissioned.

1996

- 20 January – HTMS Chakri Naruebet launched.
- 9 August – USS America decommissioned.
- 14 September – USS Harry S. Truman launched.

1997

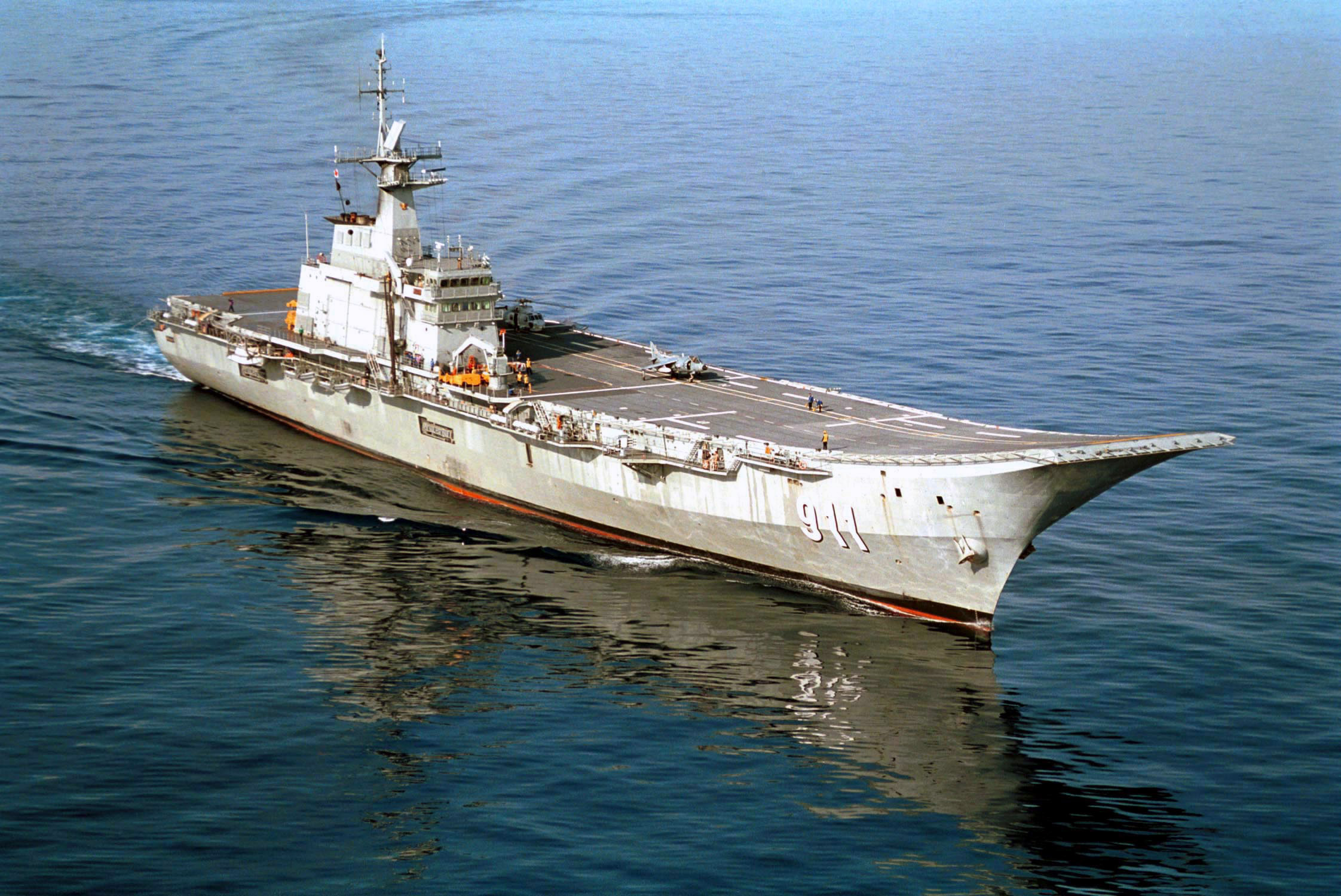
Thai carrier HTMS Chakri Naruebet

- ARA Veinticinco de Mayo decommissioned.
- 31 January – INS Vikrant (R11) decommissioned, to be converted to a museum ship at Mumbai.
- 27 March – HTMS Chakri Naruebet commissioned.
- 30 July – USS Oriskany repossessed by the USN due to default by scrapping contractor.
- 1 October – Clemenceau decommissioned.

1998

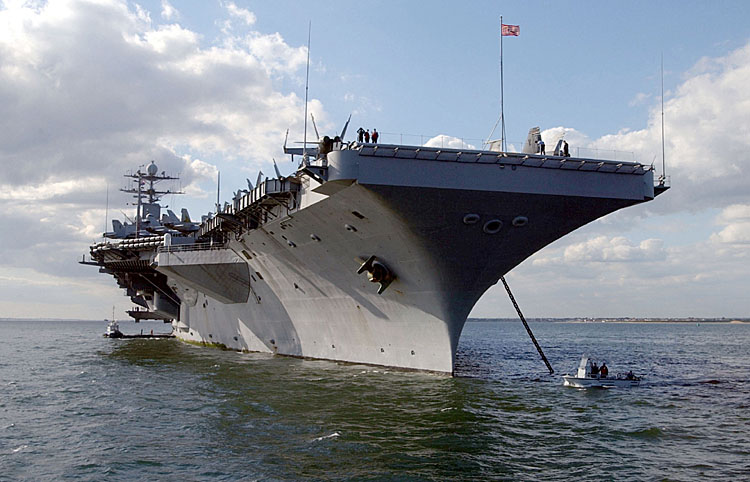
USS Harry S. Truman

- 12 February – USS Ronald Reagan laid down.
- April – Varyag sold to China.
- August – Minsk towed to China for use in an amusement park.
- 30 September – USS Independence decommissioned.
- 25 July – USS Harry S. Truman commissioned.

1999

- Varyag departed Ukraine under tow, refused passage through Bosporus Strait, stationed near the straits for three years.
- January – ARA Veinticinco de Mayo sold for scrap.

== 2000–2009 ==
2000

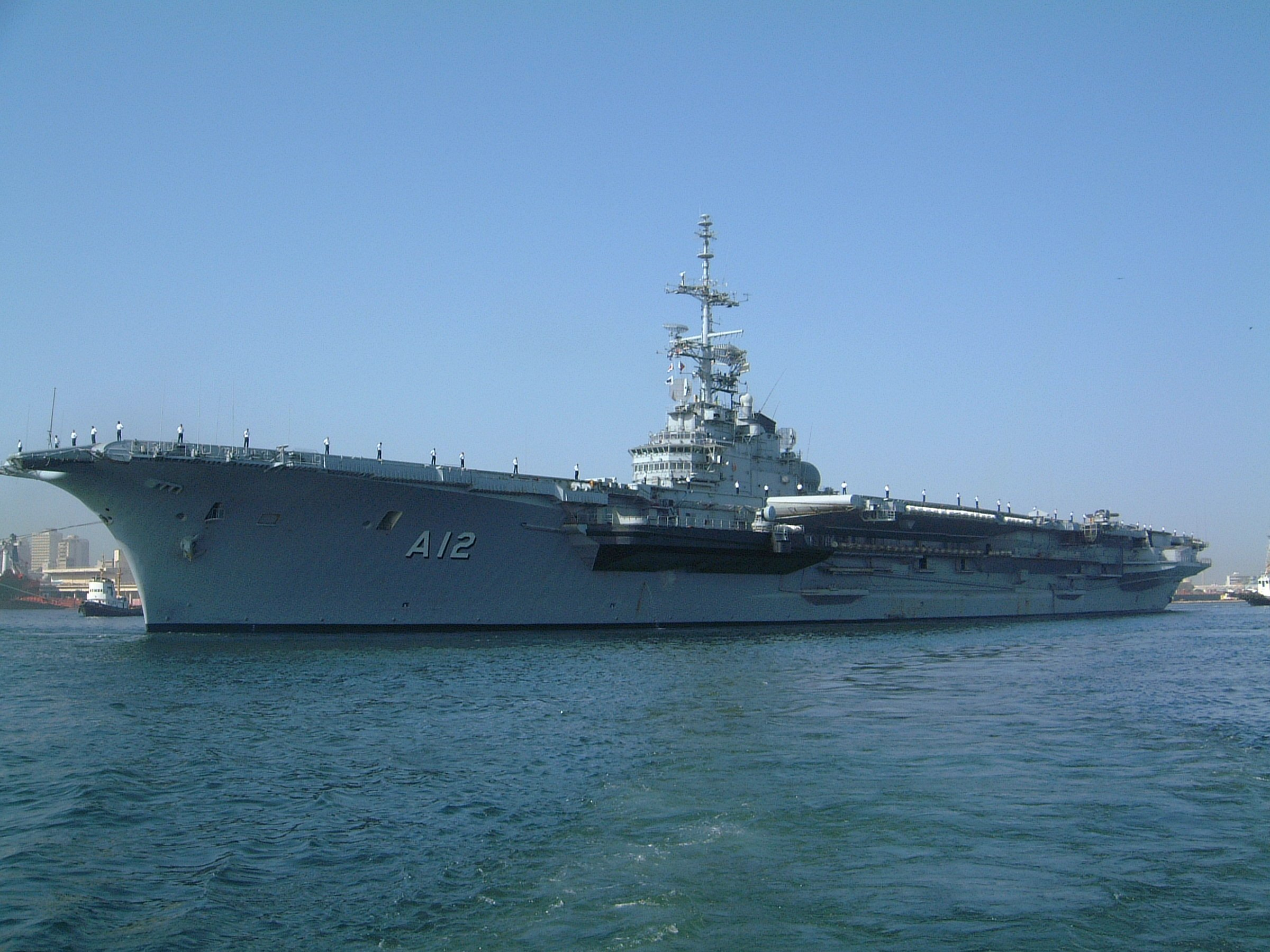
NAe São Paulo

- 1 January – USS Saratoga placed on donation hold.
- October – Scrapping of Dédalo commenced.
- 15 November – Foch decommissioned, and recommissioned as NAe São Paulo.

2001

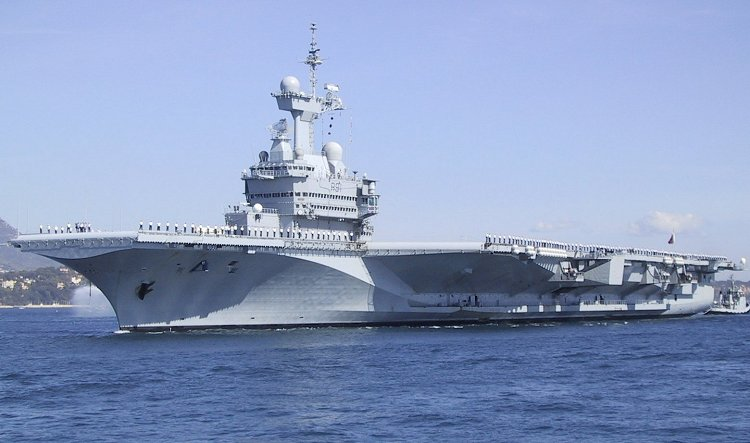
French carrier Charles de Gaulle

- 10 March – USS Ronald Reagan launched.
- 18 May – Charles de Gaulle commissioned.
- 17 July – Cavour laid down.
- 7 October – War in Afghanistan begins.
- 16 October – NAeL Minas Gerais decommissioned.

2002

- Varyag allowed passage through Bosporus Strait, arrived in Dalian Shipyard in northern China.

2003

- 20 March – US-led 2003 invasion of Iraq launched.
- 12 July – USS Ronald Reagan commissioned.
- 7 August – USS Constellation decommissioned.
- 6 September – USS George H.W. Bush laid down.
- 11 September – USS Forrestal designated for disposal.
- 2 December – USS Constellation stricken.

2004

- NAeL Minas Gerais sold for scrap.
- 20 January – Admiral Gorshkov sold to India; being refurbished and renamed INS Vikramaditya.
- April – USS Independence nominated to be sunk as artificial reef.
- 20 July – Cavour launched.

2005

- 11 April – INS Vikrant steel plate cutting started.
- 19 April – USS America towed to sea for live firing tests.
- May – Juan Carlos I laid down.
- 14 May – USS America scuttled.
- 3 August – HMS Invincible decommissioned, placed in reserve until 2010.

2006

- 17 May – USS Oriskany sunk as an artificial reef.
- 31 May – Minsk sold at auction, disposition unknown.
- 7 October – USS George H. W. Bush launched.

2007

- 1 August – USS John F. Kennedy decommissioned, placed in reserve.

2008

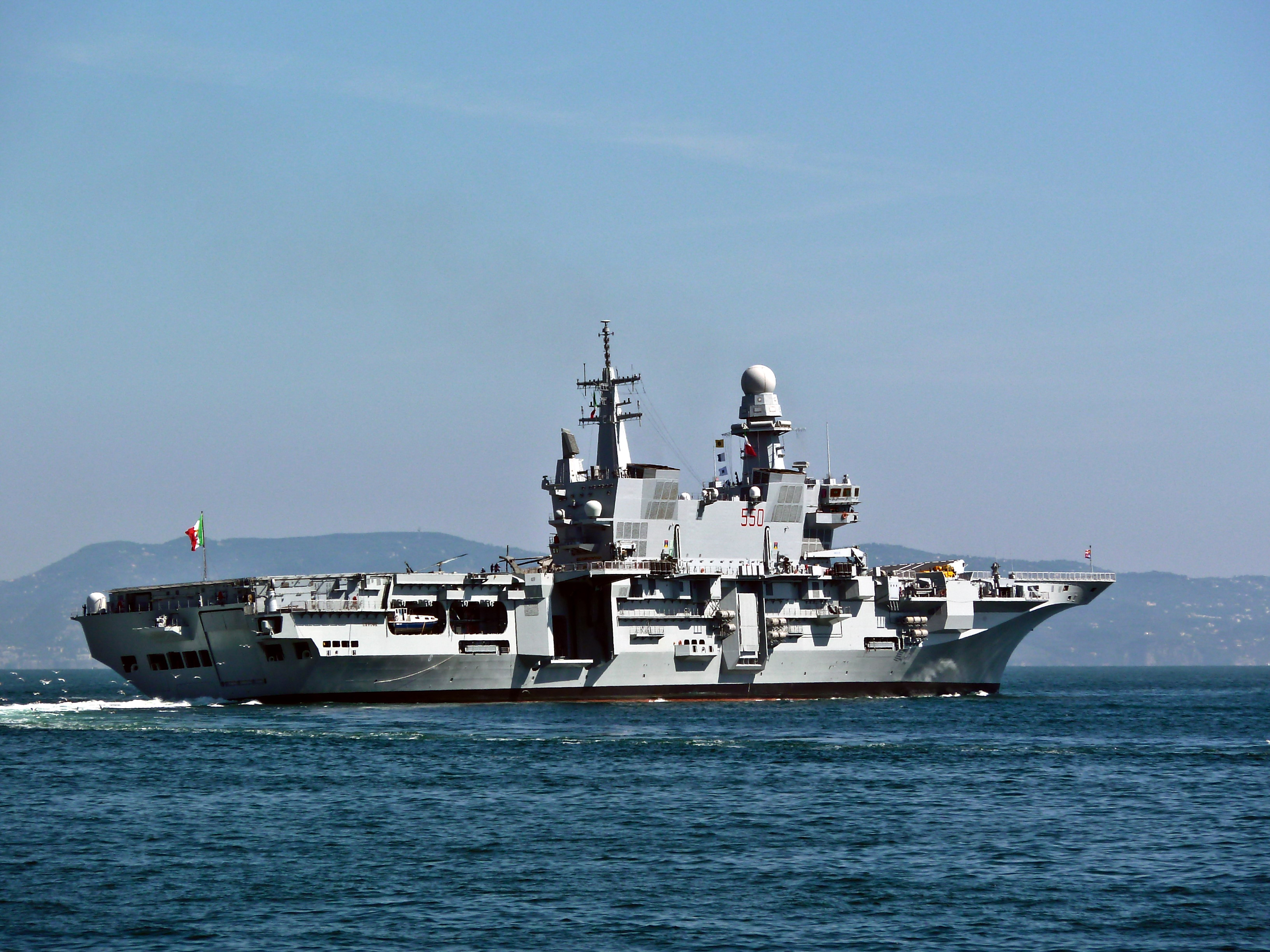
Italian carrier Cavour

- February – USS Forrestal prepared to be sunk as a reef; USS Independence and USS Constellation scheduled to be scrapped within five years.
- 10 March – Juan Carlos I launched.
- 27 March – Cavour commissioned.

2009

- 10 January – USS George H. W. Bush commissioned; final ship of the Nimitz class.
- 28 February – INS Vikrant keel laid
- 12 May – USS Kitty Hawk decommissioned, placed in reserve.
- 7 July – First steel cut for HMS Queen Elizabeth
- 13 November – USS Gerald R. Ford laid down

== 2010–2019 ==
2010

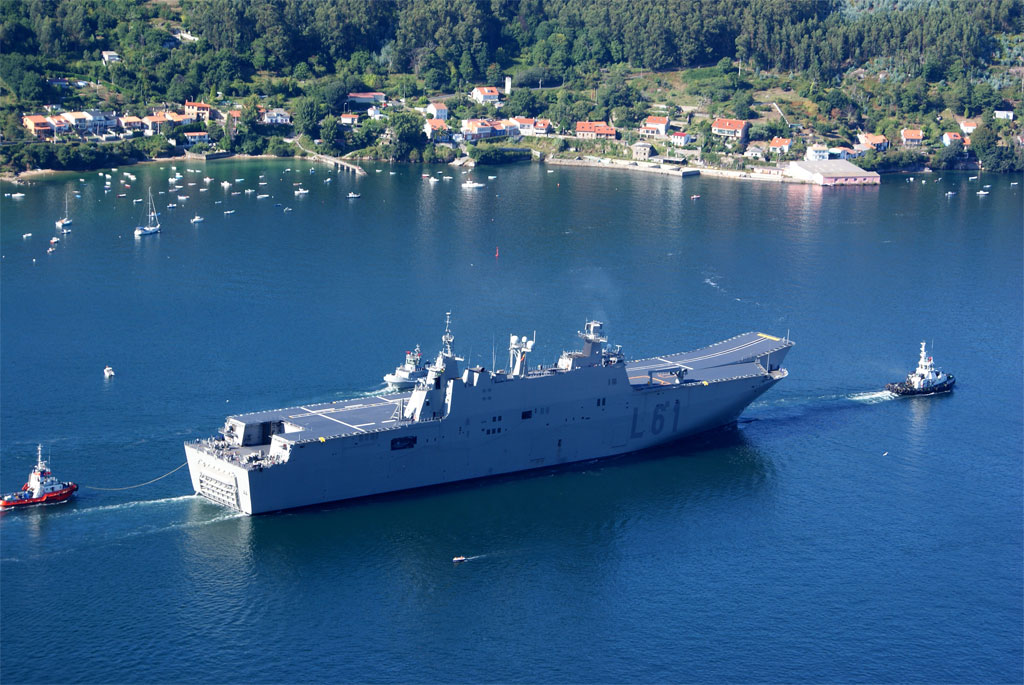
Spanish carrier Juan Carlos I

- 30 September – Juan Carlos I commissioned

2011

- 11 Mar – HMS Ark Royal (R07) decommissioned
- 26 May – First steel cut for HMS Prince of Wales
- 10 August – Ex-Varyag completed, began sea trials for the PLAN.

2012

- 8 June – INS Vikramaditya(ex-Admiral Gorshkov) commenced sea trials
- 25 September – Ex-Varyag commissioned as Chinese aircraft carrier Liaoning
- 10 October – India and Russia announce delay in handover of INS Vikramaditya delayed twelve months until fourth quarter 2013
- 1 December – USS Enterprise decommissioned

2013

- 6 February – Príncipe de Asturias (R-11) decommissioned.
- 12 August – INS Vikrant launched
- 9 November – USS Gerald R. Ford launched.
- 16 November – INS Vikramaditya (ex-Admiral Gorshkov) re-commissioned.

2014

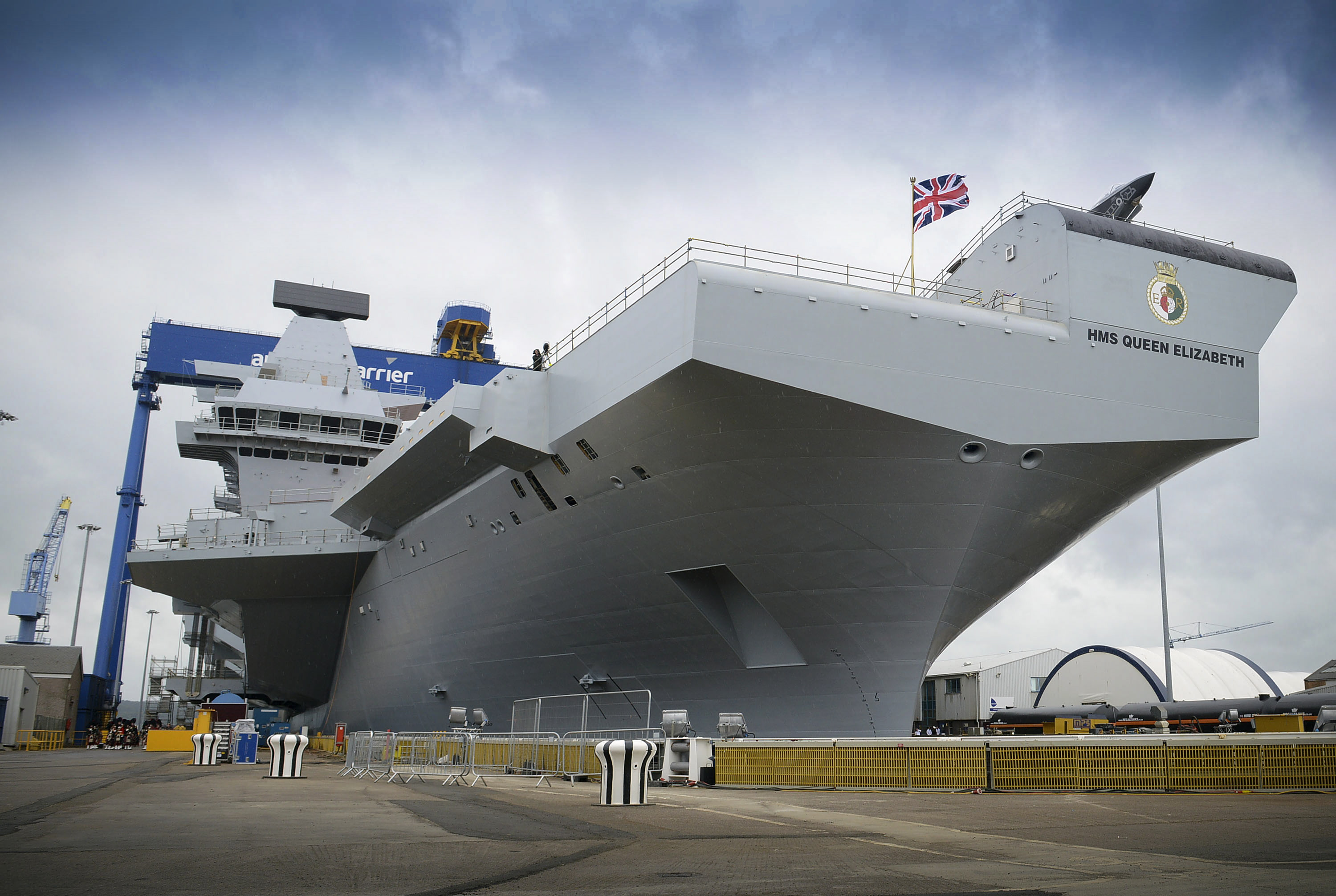
HMS Queen Elizabeth

- 17 July – HMS Queen Elizabeth (R08) launched.
- 28 August – HMS Illustrious (R06) decommissioned
- 11 Oct – USS America (LHA-6) commissioned. First of a new class of amphibious assault ships.
- 22 November – INS Vikrant (ex-HMS Hercules) scrapped
- 28 November – HMAS Canberra commissioned into the Australian Navy. First Australian helicopter carrier.

2015

- 25 March – JS Izumo commissioned into the Japanese Navy as third serving helicopter carrier
- 31 March – USS Peleliu (LHA-5) decommissioned.
- 4 December – HMAS Adelaide (L01) commissioned into the Australian Navy. Second Australian helicopter carrier.

2016

- 2 June – ENS Gamal Abdel Nasser commissioned into the Egyptian Navy. First aircraft carrier operated by an African country.
- 16 September – ENS Anwar El Sadat commissioned into the Egyptian Navy. Second Egyptian helicopter carrier.

2017

- 14 February – Brazilian aircraft carrier São Paulo (A12) (Ex-French aircraft carrier Foch (R99)) retires from service.
- 6 March – INS Viraat (ex-HMS Hermes (R12)) decommissioned from the Indian Navy.
- 22 March – JS Kaga commissioned into the Japanese Navy as fourth serving helicopter carrier.
- 8 April – USS Gerald R. Ford begins sea trials.
- 26 April – Type 001A aircraft carrier, later type 002 Shandong, launched.
- 26 June – HMS Queen Elizabeth begins sea trials.
- 24 August – USS Enterprise first steel cut.
- 8 September – HMS Prince of Wales (R09) Christened
- 7 December – HMS Queen Elizabeth (R08) commissioned
- 21 December – HMS Prince of Wales (R09) launched

2018

- 3 January 2018 – Sale of HMS Ocean (L12) to Brazil, for £84.6 million, announced.
- 29 June 2018 – PHM Atlântico (A-140) (ex-HMS Ocean (L12)) commissioned to Brazilian Navy.

2019

- 25 September – Chinese landing helicopter dock Hainan launched, the first of the new class Type 075
- 10 December – HMS Prince of Wales (R09) commissioned.
- 17 December – Type 002 commissioned as Chinese aircraft carrier Shandong, the third and likely final Kuznetsov-class aircraft carrier

== 2020–present ==
2020

- 15 July – USS Tripoli (LHA-7) commissioned, the second and last Flight 0 America-class helicopter carrier before production of the Flight 1 amphibious assault variant begins

2021

- 23 April – Chinese landing helicopter dock Hainan commissioned
- 28 June – ROKS Marado (LPH-6112) commissioned
- 4 August – INS Vikrant (2013) begins sea trials after delays
- 13 August – Italian landing helicopter dock Trieste begins sea trials
- 26 December – Chinese landing helicopter dock Guangxi commissioned, the second Type 075 landing helicopter dock

2022

- 27 February – TCG Anadolu begins sea trials
- 17 June – Chinese Type 003 aircraft carrier Fujian launched
- 2 September - INS Vikrant (2013) is commissioned into the Indian Navy.

2023

- 3 February – Decommissioned brazilian aircraft carrier São Paulo (A12) (Ex-French aircraft carrier Foch (R99)) scuttled.

2024

- ~ May 2024 - Chinese Type 003 aircraft carrier Fujian begins sea trials

2025

- 5 November - Chinese Type 003 aircraft carrier Fujian is commissioned into the Peoples Liberation Army Navy

2026

- 24 September - KRI Sriwijaya (ex-Italian aircraft carrier Giuseppe Garibaldi) is commissioned into the Indonesian Navy.

== See also ==
- Fleet of the Royal Canadian Navy
- List of active French Navy ships
- List of active Italian Navy ships
- List of active Spanish Navy ships
- List of aircraft carrier classes of the United States Navy
- List of aircraft carriers
- List of aircraft carriers by configuration
- List of aircraft carriers in service
- List of aircraft carriers of Germany
- List of aircraft carriers of Russia and the Soviet Union
- List of aircraft carriers of the Royal Navy
- List of aircraft carriers of the United States Navy
- List of amphibious warfare ships
- List of escort carriers of the Royal Navy
- List of seaplane carriers of the Royal Navy
- List of ships of the Imperial Japanese Navy
- List of sunken aircraft carriers
- List of United States Navy escort aircraft carriers
- People's Liberation Army Navy Surface Force
- Ships of the Indian Navy
- Timeline of aircraft carriers of the United States Navy

== Footnotes ==
^[I]For most carriers, the dates listed here are those when the carrier was laid down, launched, commissioned, decommissioned and disposed of. If the carrier was a conversion from another ship, then the first date listed is when she was taken in hand to be converted; however, if a carrier was subsequently redesignated, its history is followed until disposal. The first time a ship is named in the list, it is linked to the relevant page within Wikipedia; if the ship was renamed, the first instance of the new name is also linked. Additionally, key relevant historical dates are interspersed with the ship-related dates to provide context.

^[II]For the purposes of this timeline, an aircraft carrier is a commissioned naval ship with at least one permanent flush deck designed for the launch and recovery of fixed-wing aircraft. This timeline does not include ships with temporary landing or take-off platforms, vessels designed for helicopter operations, marine assault ships of various designs, catapult ships, WWII escort carriers, merchant aircraft carriers, CAM ships, nor seaplane carriers and tenders.

^[III]The timeline is mainly divided into decades, the exceptions being the two World Wars and the interwar period, which are each treated as separate blocks. For the purposes of this list, the First World War is considered to have started on 28 June 1914 and ended 11 November 1918, while the Second World War is considered to have started on 1 September 1939 and ended 14 August 1945.

^[IV] The actual text of the message from the First Lord of the Admiralty to the Wright Brothers, dated 7 March 1907, taken from The Old Flying Days by Charles Cyril Turner, p. 293, was:

I have consulted my expert advisers with regard to your suggestion as to the employment of aeroplanes and I regret to have to tell you, after the careful consideration of my Board, that the Admiralty, whilst thanking you for so kindly bringing the proposals to their notice, are of opinion that they would not be of any practical use to the Naval Service.

== Citations ==
uss kitty hawk citation 1980–1981
