= List of aircraft carriers in service =

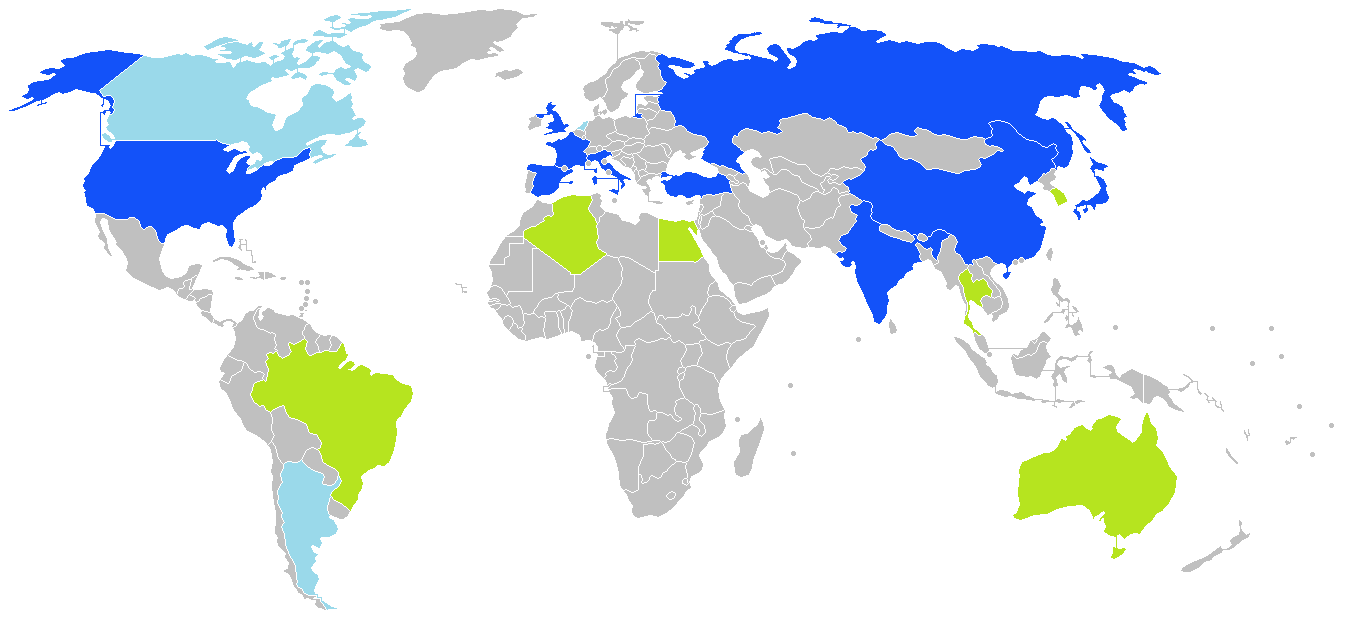
Countries currently operating fixed-wing aircraft carriers (10) Countries currently solely operating helicopter carriers (6) Historic operators of carriers (3)

This is a list of aircraft carriers which are currently in service, under maintenance or refit, in reserve, under construction, or being updated. An aircraft carrier is a warship with a full-length flight deck, hangar and facilities for arming, deploying, and recovering aircraft. The list only refers to the status of the ship, not availability or condition of an air wing. This includes helicopter carriers and also amphibious assault ships, if the vessel's primary purpose is to carry, arm, deploy, and recover aircraft.

== Summary ==
Country	Navy	Commissioned	In reserve	Undergoing trials	Fitting out	Under construction	Ordered	Planned
Australia	Royal Australian Navy	2	0	0	0	0	0	0
Brazil	Brazilian Navy	1	0	0	0	0	0	1
China	People's Liberation Army Navy	7	0	1	0	1	0	9
Egypt	Egyptian Navy	2	0	0	0	0	0	0
France	French Navy	4	0	0	0	0	0	1
India	Indian Navy	2	0	0	0	0	0	6
Indonesia	Indonesian Navy	1	0	0	0	0	0	0
Italy	Italian Navy	2	0	0	0	0	0	3
Japan	Japan Maritime Self-Defense Force	4	0	0	0	0	0	0
Russia	Russian Navy	1	0	0	0	2	0	1
South Korea	Republic of Korea Navy	2	0	0	0	0	0	3
Spain	Spanish Navy	1	0	0	0	0	0	2
Thailand	Royal Thai Navy	1	0	0	0	0	0	0
Turkey	Turkish Naval Forces	1	0	0	0	1	0	1
United Kingdom	Royal Navy	2	0	0	0	0	0	0
United States	United States Navy	20	0	1	1	3	3	10

== Commissioned carriers ==
Country	Class	Name (hull number)	Length	Tonnage	Propulsion	Type	Classification	Commissioned
Australia	Canberra (modified Juan Carlos I-class)	Canberra (L02)	230 m (750 ft)	27,100 t	Conventional	STOVL	LHD	28 November 2014
Australia	Canberra (modified Juan Carlos I-class)	Adelaide (L01)	230 m (750 ft)	27,100 t	Conventional	STOVL	LHD	4 December 2015
Brazil	Ocean	Atlântico (A140)	203.4 m (667 ft)	21,500 t	Conventional	VTOL	LPH	29 June 2018
China	Type 001 (modified Kuznetsov-class)	Liaoning (16)	306.4 m (1,005 ft)	60,900 t	Conventional	STOBAR	Aircraft carrier	25 September 2012
China	Type 002 (modified Kuznetsov-class)	Shandong (17)	305 m (1,001 ft)	60,000 t	Conventional	STOBAR	Aircraft carrier	17 December 2019
China	Type 003	Fujian	316 m (1,037 ft)	80,000+ t	Conventional	CATOBAR	Aircraft carrier	5 November 2025
China	Type 075	Hainan (31)	232 m (761 ft)	36,000 t	Conventional	VTOL	LHD	23 April 2021
China	Type 075	Guangxi (32)	232 m (761 ft)	36,000 t	Conventional	VTOL	LHD	26 December 2021
China	Type 075	Anhui (33)	232 m (761 ft)	36,000 t	Conventional	VTOL	LHD	1 October 2022
China	Type 075	Hubei (34)	232 m (761 ft)	36,000 t	Conventional	VTOL	LHD	1 August 2025
Egypt	Mistral	Gamal Abdel Nasser (L1010)	199 m (653 ft)	21,300 t	Conventional	VTOL	LHD	2 June 2016
Egypt	Mistral	Anwar El Sadat (L1020)	199 m (653 ft)	21,300 t	Conventional	VTOL	LHD	16 September 2016
France	Charles de Gaulle	Charles de Gaulle (R91)	262 m (860 ft)	42,000 t	Nuclear	CATOBAR	Aircraft carrier	18 May 2001
France	Mistral	Mistral (L9013)	199 m (653 ft)	21,300 t	Conventional	VTOL	LHD	1 February 2006
France	Mistral	Tonnerre (L9014)	199 m (653 ft)	21,300 t	Conventional	VTOL	LHD	1 December 2006
France	Mistral	Dixmude (L9015)	199 m (653 ft)	21,300 t	Conventional	VTOL	LHD	27 December 2012
India	Vikramaditya (modified Kiev-class)	Vikramaditya (R33)	284 m (932 ft)	45,400 t	Conventional	STOBAR	Aircraft carrier	16 November 2013
India	Vikrant	Vikrant (R11)	262 m (860 ft)	45,000 t	Conventional	STOBAR	Aircraft carrier	2 September 2022
Indonesia	Giuseppe Garibaldi	Sriwijaya (100)	180 m (590 ft)	14,150 t	Conventional	V/STOL	Light aircraft carrier	24 September 2026
Italy	Cavour	Cavour (C 550)	244 m (801 ft)	30,000 t	Conventional	STOVL	Aircraft carrier	27 March 2008
Italy	Trieste	Trieste (L9890)	245 m (804 ft)	38,000 t	Conventional	STOVL	Aircraft carrier	7 December 2024
Japan	Izumo	Izumo (DDH-183)	248 m (814 ft)	27,000 t	Conventional	VTOL	Helicopter Destroyer / Light aircraft carrier (from 2024)	25 March 2015
Japan	Izumo	Kaga (DDH-184)	248 m (814 ft)	27,000 t	Conventional	VTOL	Helicopter Destroyer / Light aircraft carrier (from 2024)	22 March 2017
Japan	Hyūga	Hyūga (DDH-181)	197 m (646 ft)	19,000 t	Conventional	VTOL	Helicopter Destroyer	18 March 2009
Japan	Hyūga	Ise (DDH-182)	197 m (646 ft)	19,000 t	Conventional	VTOL	Helicopter Destroyer	16 March 2011
Russia	Kuznetsov	Admiral Kuznetsov (063)	306.5 m (1,006 ft)	58,600 t	Conventional	STOBAR	Aircraft cruiser	21 January 1991
South Korea	Dokdo	Dokdo (LPH-6111)	199 m (653 ft)	18,800 t	Conventional	VTOL	LPH	3 July 2007
South Korea	Dokdo	Marado (LPH-6112)	199 m (653 ft)	18,800 t	Conventional	VTOL	LPH	28 June 2021
Spain	Juan Carlos I	Juan Carlos I (L61)	231 m (758 ft)	26,000 t	Conventional	STOVL	LHD	30 September 2010
Thailand	Príncipe de Asturias	Chakri Naruebet (911)	183 m (600 ft)	11,486 t	Conventional	STOVL	Light aircraft carrier (since 2006 used as a helicopter carrier)	10 August 1997
Turkey	Anadolu	Anadolu (L-400)	230.8 m (757 ft)	27,500 t	Conventional	V/STOL	LHD, Drone carrier	10 April 2023
United Kingdom	Queen Elizabeth	Queen Elizabeth (R08)	280 m (920 ft)	80,600 t	Conventional (IEP)	STOVL	Aircraft carrier	7 December 2017
United Kingdom	Queen Elizabeth	Prince of Wales (R09)	280 m (920 ft)	80,600 t	Conventional (IEP)	STOVL	Aircraft carrier	10 December 2019
United States	Gerald R. Ford	Gerald R. Ford (CVN-78)	337 m (1,106 ft)	101,600 t	Nuclear	CATOBAR	Aircraft carrier	22 July 2017
United States	Nimitz	Nimitz (CVN-68)	333 m (1,093 ft)	101,600 t	Nuclear	CATOBAR	Aircraft carrier	3 May 1975
United States	Nimitz	Dwight D. Eisenhower (CVN-69)	333 m (1,093 ft)	103,300 t	Nuclear	CATOBAR	Aircraft carrier	18 October 1977
United States	Nimitz	Carl Vinson (CVN-70)	333 m (1,093 ft)	102,900 t	Nuclear	CATOBAR	Aircraft carrier	13 March 1982
United States	Nimitz	Theodore Roosevelt (CVN-71)	333 m (1,093 ft)	106,300 t	Nuclear	CATOBAR	Aircraft carrier	25 October 1986
United States	Nimitz	Abraham Lincoln (CVN-72)	333 m (1,093 ft)	106,000 t	Nuclear	CATOBAR	Aircraft carrier	11 November 1989
United States	Nimitz	George Washington (CVN-73)	333 m (1,093 ft)	105,900 t	Nuclear	CATOBAR	Aircraft carrier	4 July 1992
United States	Nimitz	John C. Stennis (CVN-74)	333 m (1,093 ft)	105,000 t	Nuclear	CATOBAR	Aircraft carrier	9 December 1995
United States	Nimitz	Harry S. Truman (CVN-75)	333 m (1,093 ft)	105,600 t	Nuclear	CATOBAR	Aircraft carrier	25 July 1998
United States	Nimitz	Ronald Reagan (CVN-76)	333 m (1,093 ft)	103,000 t	Nuclear	CATOBAR	Aircraft carrier	12 July 2003
United States	Nimitz	George H.W. Bush (CVN-77)	333 m (1,093 ft)	103,600 t	Nuclear	CATOBAR	Aircraft carrier	10 January 2009
United States	America	America (LHA-6)	257 m (843 ft)	45,000 t	Conventional	STOVL	LHA (Flight 0 used as helicopter carriers)	11 October 2014
United States	America	Tripoli (LHA-7)	257 m (843 ft)	45,000 t	Conventional	STOVL	LHA (Flight 0 used as helicopter carriers)	15 July 2020
United States	Wasp	Wasp (LHD-1)	257 m (843 ft)	40,532 t	Conventional	STOVL	LHD	29 July 1989
United States	Wasp	Essex (LHD-2)	257 m (843 ft)	40,650 t	Conventional	STOVL	LHD	17 October 1992
United States	Wasp	Kearsarge (LHD-3)	257 m (843 ft)	40,500 t	Conventional	STOVL	LHD	16 October 1993
United States	Wasp	Boxer (LHD-4)	257 m (843 ft)	40,722 t	Conventional	STOVL	LHD	11 February 1995
United States	Wasp	Bataan (LHD-5)	257 m (843 ft)	40,358 t	Conventional	STOVL	LHD	20 September 1997
United States	Wasp	Iwo Jima (LHD-7)	257 m (843 ft)	40,530 t	Conventional	STOVL	LHD	30 June 2001
United States	Wasp	Makin Island (LHD-8)	257 m (843 ft)	41,649 t	Conventional	STOVL	LHD	24 October 2009
Country	Class	Name (hull number)	Length	Tonnage	Propulsion	Type	Classification	Commissioned

== Carriers undergoing sea trials ==
Country	Class	Ship (hull number)	Length	Tonnage	Propulsion	Type	Commissioning	Status
China	Type 076	Sichuan	252.3 m (828 ft)	50,000 t	Conventional	CATOBAR	2027 (planned)	Sea trials
United States	Ford	John F. Kennedy (CVN-79)	337 m (1,106 ft)	100,000 t	Nuclear	CATOBAR	2027 (planned)	Sea trials

== Carriers fitting out ==
Country	Class	Ship (hull number)	Length	Tonnage	Propulsion	Type	Commissioning	Status
United States	America	Bougainville (LHA-8)	257 m (843 ft)	45,000 t	Conventional	STOVL	2027 (planned)	Fitting out

== Carriers under construction ==
Country	Class	Ship (hull number)	Length	Tonnage	Propulsion	Type	Commissioning	Status
China	Type 004	TBD	TBD	110,000 - 120,000 t	Nuclear	CATOBAR	TBD	Under construction
Russia	Project 23900	Ivan Rogov	220 m (720 ft)	40,000 t	Conventional	VTOL	2028 (planned)	Under construction
Russia	Project 23900	Mitrofan Moskalenko	220 m (720 ft)	40,000 t	Conventional	VTOL	2029 (planned)	Under construction
Turkey	MUGEM-class aircraft carrier	TBD	285 m (935 ft)	60,000 t	Conventional	STOBAR	2032 (planned)	Under construction
United States	Ford	Enterprise (CVN-80)	333 m (1,093 ft)	100,000 t	Nuclear	CATOBAR	2031 (planned)	Under construction
United States	Ford	Doris Miller (CVN-81)	333 m (1,093 ft)	100,000 t	Nuclear	CATOBAR	2034 (planned)	Under construction
United States	America	Fallujah (LHA-9)	257 m (843 ft)	45,000 t	Conventional	STOVL	2031 (planned)	Under construction

== Carriers ordered ==
Country	Class	Ship (hull number)	Length	Tonnage	Propulsion	Type	Commissioned	Notes
United States	Ford	William J. Clinton (CVN-82)	333 m (1,093 ft)	100,000 t	Nuclear	CATOBAR	2039 (planned)	
United States	Ford	George W. Bush (CVN-83)	333 m (1,093 ft)	100,000 t	Nuclear	CATOBAR	TBD	
United States	America	Helmand Province (LHA-10)	257 m (843 ft)	45,000 t	Conventional	STOVL	TBD	

== Other planned carriers ==
Country	Class	Ship (hull number)	Length	Tonnage	Propulsion	Type	Commissioned
Brazil	TBD	TBD	TBD	TBD	TBD	TBD	TBD
China	Type 004	TBD	TBD	110,000 t	Nuclear	CATOBAR	TBD
China	Type 004	TBD	TBD	110,000 t	Nuclear	CATOBAR	TBD
China	Type 004	TBD	TBD	110,000 t	Nuclear	CATOBAR	TBD
China	Type 004	TBD	TBD	110,000 t	Nuclear	CATOBAR	TBD
China	Type 004	TBD	TBD	110,000 t	Nuclear	CATOBAR	TBD
China	Type 075	TBD	232 m (761 ft)	36,000 t	Conventional	VTOL	TBD
China	Type 075	TBD	232 m (761 ft)	36,000 t	Conventional	VTOL	TBD
China	Type 075	TBD	232 m (761 ft)	36,000 t	Conventional	VTOL	TBD
China	Type 075	TBD	232 m (761 ft)	36,000 t	Conventional	VTOL	TBD
France	PANG	France Libre	300 m (980 ft)	75,000 t	Nuclear	CATOBAR	2038+ (planned)
India	Vikrant	IAC-II	TBD	45,000 t	Conventional	STOBAR	2030–2035 (planned)
India	Vishal	Vishal (IAC-III)	TBD	65,000 t	Conventional/Nuclear	CATOBAR	2040 (planned)
India	MRSV	TBD	TBD	30,000 t	Conventional	VTOL/STOVL	TBD
India	MRSV	TBD	TBD	30,000 t	Conventional	VTOL/STOVL	TBD
India	MRSV	TBD	TBD	30,000 t	Conventional	VTOL/STOVL	TBD
India	MRSV	TBD	TBD	30,000 t	Conventional	VTOL/STOVL	TBD
Italy	LxD	TBD	160 m (520 ft)	16,500 t	Conventional	STOVL	2028–2030 (planned)
Italy	LxD	TBD	160 m (520 ft)	16,500 t	Conventional	STOVL	2028–2030 (planned)
Italy	LxD	TBD	160 m (520 ft)	16,500 t	Conventional	STOVL	2031+ (planned)
Russia	Project 23000 aircraft carrier/Shtorm	TBD	330 m (1,080 ft)	100,000 t	TBD	STOBAR	2025+ (planned)
South Korea	CVX	TBD	TBD	40,000 t	Conventional	STOVL	2030–2033 (planned)
South Korea	CVX	TBD	TBD	40,000 t	Conventional	STOVL	TBD
South Korea	CVX	TBD	TBD	40,000 t	Conventional	STOVL	TBD
Spain	Juan Carlos I-class	TBD	232 m (761 ft)	26,000 t	Conventional	STOVL	TBD
Spain	TBD	TBD	TBD	40,000 t	Conventional	CATOBAR	TBD
Turkey	Anadolu (modified Juan Carlos I-class)	Trakya (TBD)	232 m (761 ft)	26,000 t	Conventional	STOVL	TBD
United States	Ford	TBD (CVN-84)	333 m (1,093 ft)	100,000 t	Nuclear	CATOBAR	TBD
United States	Ford	TBD (CVN-85)	333 m (1,093 ft)	100,000 t	Nuclear	CATOBAR	TBD
United States	Ford	TBD (CVN-86)	333 m (1,093 ft)	100,000 t	Nuclear	CATOBAR	TBD
United States	Ford	TBD (CVN-87)	333 m (1,093 ft)	100,000 t	Nuclear	CATOBAR	TBD
United States	America	TBD (LHA-11)	257 m (843 ft)	45,000 t	Conventional	STOVL	TBD
United States	America	TBD (LHA-12)	257 m (843 ft)	45,000 t	Conventional	STOVL	TBD
United States	America	TBD (LHA-13)	257 m (843 ft)	45,000 t	Conventional	STOVL	TBD
United States	America	TBD (LHA-14)	257 m (843 ft)	45,000 t	Conventional	STOVL	TBD
United States	America	TBD (LHA-15)	257 m (843 ft)	45,000 t	Conventional	STOVL	TBD
United States	America	TBD (LHA-16)	257 m (843 ft)	45,000 t	Conventional	STOVL	TBD

== Carriers under maintenance ==
Country	Class	Ship (hull number)	Propulsion	Commissioned	Shipyard	Date Started	Date Completed	Notes
Russia	Kuznetsov	Admiral Kuznetsov (063)	Conventional	21 January 1991	Murmansk	2017	TBD	Overhaul and repairs (likely suspended indefinitely)
United States	Nimitz	John C. Stennis (CVN-74)	Nuclear	9 December 1995	Newport News	May 2021	October 2026 (planned)	RCOH
United States	Nimitz	Harry S. Truman (CVN-75)	Nuclear	25 July 1998	Newport News	June 2026 (planned)	January 2031 (planned)	RCOH
United States	Gerald R. Ford	Gerald R. Ford (CVN-78)	Nuclear	22 July 2017	Norfolk Naval Shipyard	July 2026	Early 2027 (planned)	Planned Incremental Availability (PIA)

== See also ==
- List of aircraft carriers (all time)
- List of aircraft carriers by configuration
- List of aircraft carriers by country
- List of aircraft carrier classes in service
- List of sunken aircraft carriers
- Timeline for aircraft carrier service

== Bibliography ==
- International Institute for Strategic Studies (2010-02-03). Hackett, James (ed.). The Military Balance 2010. London: Routledge. ISBN 978-1-85743-557-3.
