= List of aircraft carriers in service by configuration =

The list of aircraft carriers by configuration contains active aircraft carriers organized by the specific configuration of aircraft carrier designs. This list excludes seaplane carriers or helicopter carriers.

== Carrier configurations ==
There are three main configurations of aircraft carrier in service in the worlds navies:

- Catapult Assisted Take-Off Barrier Arrested Recovery (CATOBAR)
- Short Take-Off Barrier Arrested Recovery (STOBAR)
- Short Take-Off Vertical Landing (STOVL)

=== Navies with CATOBAR carriers ===
- Chinese Navy
  - Type 003
    - Fujian *(equipped with EMALS)
- French Navy
  - FS Charles de Gaulle
- United States Navy
  - Nimitz class
    - USS Nimitz
    - USS Dwight D. Eisenhower
    - USS Carl Vinson
    - USS Theodore Roosevelt
    - USS Abraham Lincoln
    - USS George Washington
    - USS John C. Stennis
    - USS Harry S. Truman
    - USS Ronald Reagan
    - USS George H.W. Bush
  - Gerald R. Ford class *(equipped with EMALS)
    - USS Gerald R. Ford *

=== Navies with STOBAR carriers ===
- Chinese Navy
  - Type 001 - Modified Kuznetsov class
    - Liaoning
  - Type 002 - Modified Kuznetsov class
    - Shandong
- Indian Navy
  - Modified Kiev class
    - INS Vikramaditya
  - Vikrant class
    - INS Vikrant
- Russian Navy
  - Kuznetsov class
    - RFS Admiral Kuznetsov

=== Navies with STOVL carriers ===
- Italian Navy
  - ITS Cavour
  - ITS Trieste
- Japan Maritime Self-Defense Force
  - Izumo class
    - JS Izumo
    - JS Kaga
- Royal Navy
  - Queen Elizabeth class
    - HMS Queen Elizabeth
    - HMS Prince of Wales
- Spanish Navy
  - Juan Carlos I class
    - SNS Juan Carlos I
- Indonesian Navy
  - KRI Sriwijaya
- Turkish Navy
  - Juan Carlos I class
    - TCG Anadolu
- United States Navy
  - Wasp class
    - USS Wasp
    - USS Essex
    - USS Kearsarge
    - USS Boxer
    - USS Bataan
    - USS Iwo Jima
    - USS Makin Island
  - America class
    - USS America
    - USS Tripoli

== See also ==
- List of amphibious warfare ships
- List of aircraft carriers
- List of aircraft carriers in service
- Timeline for aircraft carrier service
- List of aircraft carriers by country
- Helicopter Carrier
