= USCGC Cobb =

WWII USCG cutter

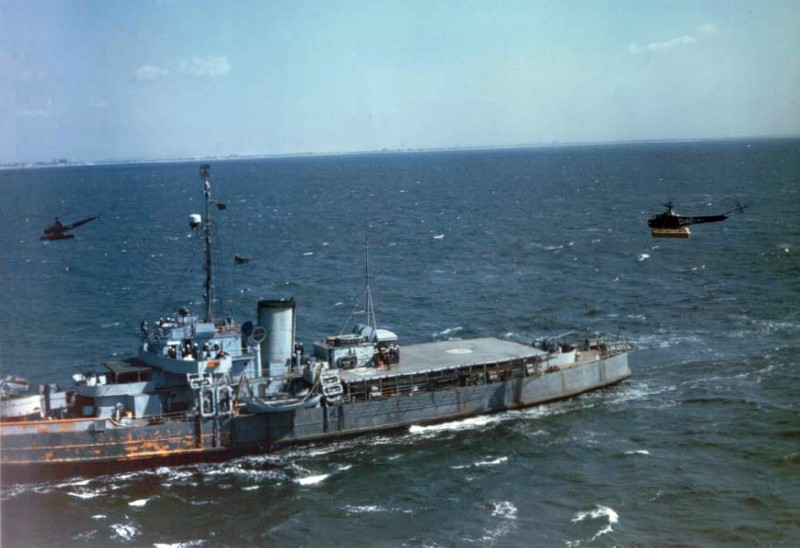
- Sikorsky helicopters conducting experimental flight operations on USCGC Cobb

History

United States
- Name: USCGC Cobb
- Operator: United States Coast Guard
- Builder: Delaware River Iron Ship Building and Engine Works (Chester, Pennsylvania)
- Cost: $2,500,000
- Launched: 21 April 1906
- Completed: 1906
- Commissioned: 20 July 1943
- Decommissioned: 31 January 1946
- Identification: Hull number: WPG-181
- Fate: Sold, 6 March 1947, scrapped later that year

General characteristics
- Type: Cutter/helicopter carrier
- Displacement: 3,500 tons
- Length: 300 ft (91 m)
- Beam: 55 ft (17 m)
- Draft: 19 ft (5.8 m)
- Propulsion: 3 × Parsons LP impulse turbine, center turbine high pressure, outboard turbines, low pressure; 6 × Scotch boilers, 5,000 shp (3,700 kW); triple screws
- Speed: 15.7 knots (29.1 km/h; 18.1 mph)
- Range: Cruising: 3,300 mi (5,300 km) at 14.7 knots (27.2 km/h; 16.9 mph); Economy: 4,370 mi (7,030 km) at 9.5 knots (17.6 km/h; 10.9 mph)
- Complement: 9 officers, 114 enlisted
- Electronic warfare & decoys: SA & SL detection radars; QCL-8 sonar
- Armament: 2 × 5"/38 guns (single); 6 × 20 mm/80 guns (single); depth charge tracks; 4 "Y" guns; 2 mousetraps
- Aircraft carried: None permanently assigned, operated with both HNS-1 and HOS-1 helicopters
- Aviation facilities: 38 ft × 63 ft (12 m × 19 m) flight deck
- Notes: First US helicopter carrier (1944); also originally (1906) America's first turbine-powered steamship

USCGC Cobb (WPG-181) was a United States Coast Guard cutter commissioned during World War II. A conversion of the 1906 coastal steamboat SS Governor Cobb, USCGC Cobb in the hands of the Coast Guard became the first US helicopter carrier.

== Background ==
The U.S. government became interested in the potential of the helicopter during the 1930s. In 1938, the government allocated two million dollars toward development of the machine, and an inter-agency board—which included a representative from the U.S. Coast Guard, Commander William J. Kossler—was established to oversee the program. Kossler had difficulty persuading the U.S. Navy of the utility of the helicopter and eventually enlisted the aid of Executive Officer Lieutenant Commander Frank Erickson of Coast Guard Air Station Brooklyn.

Erickson, who had helplessly watched sailors burn to death in oil slicks with no hope of rescue during the Japanese attack on Pearl Harbor, immediately saw the utility of the helicopter in a search-and-rescue role. However, as the Navy showed little interest at this time in development of improved search-and-rescue methods, Erickson promoted the helicopter's usefulness as an anti-submarine warfare (ASW) weapon instead. This proposal met with the approval of the Navy, and on 19 February 1943, the Coast Guard was formally assigned the task of developing the helicopter for the ASW role.

== Acquisition and refit ==
As part of its ASW program, the Coast Guard began experimenting with ship-based helicopter operations. Initially, a series of flights was conducted from the deck of a ship at anchor, Bunker Hill. When these trials proved successful, the Coast Guard moved to open sea trials.

For the sea trials, the Coast Guard acquired an ageing passenger steamer, SS Governor Cobb, from the War Shipping Administration. The Coast Guard carried out major modifications to the ship, including removal of much of the ship's superstructure for the installation of a 38 × 63 foot flight deck for the use of helicopters, plus the addition of armor and weaponry. Following these modifications, the ship was commissioned on 20 July 1943 as USCGC Cobb (WPG-181)—the first US helicopter carrier.

== Service history ==
In January 1944, the ship was ordered to Groton, Connecticut for sound and radar training. In April, the ship was assigned to New York City to train for helicopter landings on board its flight deck. The first such landing occurred on 15 June. On 29 July 1944, the first take-off took place in Long Island Sound from Cobb' flight deck.

With the threat from submarines greatly diminished by early 1945, the Coast Guard turned its attention to development of the helicopter in the search-and-rescue role. USCGC Cobb also played a role in this program when helicopters from its flight deck performed some of the earliest air-sea rescues.

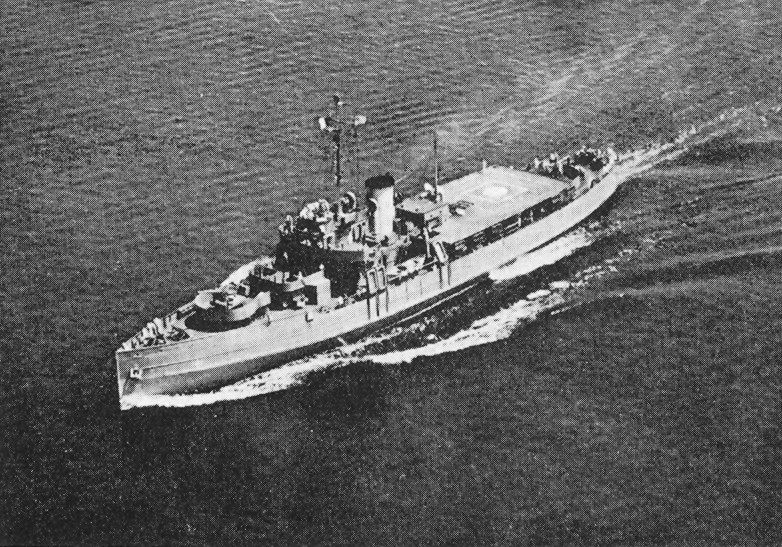
USCGC Cobb underway after addition of the flight deck aft.

In spite of her historic achievements, USCGC Cobb proved an unsatisfactory acquisition. Originally America's first turbine-powered steamship, the aging 37-year-old vessel proved a liability to the Coast Guard with her excessive maintenance costs. During the first 115 days of the ship's service, Cobb was absent from the repair yard for a total of only nine days. Thereafter she managed operational duties an average of only one week out of four.

USCGC Cobb was decommissioned by the Coast Guard on 31 January 1946. She was sold on 6 March 1947, and scrapped a short time later.
