= SS Governor Cobb =

American coastal passenger steamboat

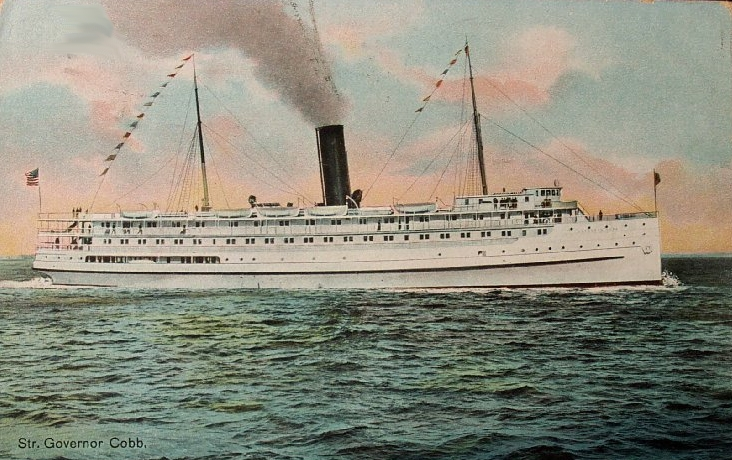
- SS Governor Cobb

History
- Name: Governor Cobb
- Operator: Eastern Steamship Company; P&O
- Route: Boston-New Brunswick; Key West-Havana
- Builder: Delaware River Iron Shipbuilding and Engine Works
- Launched: 21 April 1906
- Completed: 1906
- Fate: Scrapped 1947

General characteristics
- Type: Passenger
- Displacement: 3,500 tons
- Length: 300 ft
- Beam: 51 ft
- Draft: 14 ft
- Propulsion: 3 × Parsons LP impulse turbine, center turbine high pressure, outboard turbines, low pressure; 6 × Scotch boilers, 5,000 SHP; triple screws
- Speed: 17.5 knots

SS Governor Cobb was an American coastal passenger steamboat built in 1906. The ship has the double distinction of being not only the first American-built ship to be powered by steam turbines, but also, late in her career, of becoming the world's first helicopter carrier.

== Development and design ==
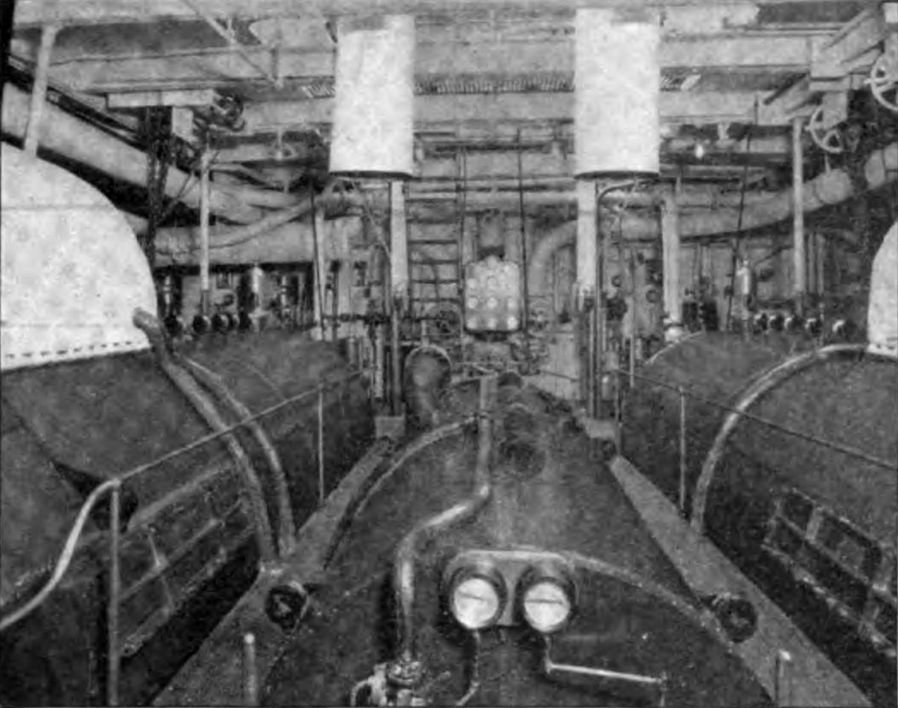
Engine room of Governor Cobb looking forward, showing the three turbines

Governor Cobb was ordered by the Eastern Steamship Company of Charles W. Morse from the marine engine specialists W. & A. Fletcher Co. of Hoboken, New Jersey. W. & A. Fletcher had recently licensed the revolutionary steam turbine technology from the Parsons Marine Steam Turbine Company of Great Britain, and a Parsons design was utilized for Governor Cobb's powerplant.

The powerplant consisted of one large high-pressure central turbine for providing the motive power to a central propeller, and a pair of low-pressure turbines driving two outboard screws which were used for manoeuvre, and which were shut down when the vessel was under way. Steam was provided by six single-ended, forced draft Scotch boilers delivering a pressure of 150 pounds. W. & A. Fletcher subcontracted the hull to the Delaware River Iron Shipbuilding and Engine Works of Chester, Pennsylvania.

Construction of the engines aroused considerable interest, and when the vessel had been completed, the Department of Naval Architecture received permission from the President of the Eastern Steamship Company, Calvin Austin, to conduct a number of tests. The tests were conducted by the Bureau of Steam Engineering, which was obliged to borrow one of only two instruments in the United States capable of determining the horsepower of a steam turbine. The turbines were found to deliver a total of 5,000 horsepower, which gave the vessel a speed of 17½ knots.

When completed, Governor Cobb was 300 feet long, with a 51-foot beam and draft of 14 feet. The ship had a double steel bottom and four decks—a main deck, saloon, gallery and dome deck. The ship had 175 staterooms, and could carry a large number of passengers. It also carried freight in the hold and on the main deck.

== Pre–World War II service ==
Governor Cobb entered service in 1906 and was employed by the Eastern Steamship Company on the Boston to New Brunswick route. During the winter she was leased to the Oriental and Occidental Steamship Co. (later Peninsular & Occidental Steamship Co.) to operate between Key West and Havana. During World War I, the ship was requisitioned as a training ship by the United States Shipping Board. Following the war, she resumed sailing to Cuba for the Peninsular & Occidental Steamship Co., a subsidiary of the Florida East Coast Railway for service on the Key West to Havana route.

In 1937, the ship was sold to the Romance Line but failed an inspection by the Bureau of Navigation and Steamboat Inspection and was subsequently laid up. On 5 June 1942, Governor Cobb was requisitioned at Philadelphia by the War Shipping Administration, after which she was stationed at New York City.

== Coast Guard service ==
Following Governor Cobb's acquisition by the War Shipping Administration, the ship was acquired by the United States Coast Guard which was in the process of testing the effectiveness of the newly developed Sikorsky helicopter for anti-submarine warfare. The Coast Guard renamed the ship USCGC Cobb (WPG-181) and carried out extensive modifications, including removal of much of the superstructure and the installation of a large 38 × 63 foot flight deck for the purpose of testing helicopter take-offs and landings at sea. USCGC Cobb thus became the world's first helicopter carrier.

On 29 June 1944, the first successful take-off from a ship underway was performed from the flight deck of USCGC Cobb. Cobb also later took part in some of the first helicopter search-and-rescue trials. Due to high maintenance costs, USCGC Cobb was decommissioned and sold shortly after the war. She was scrapped in 1947.
