= Helicopter carrier =

Type of aircraft carrier

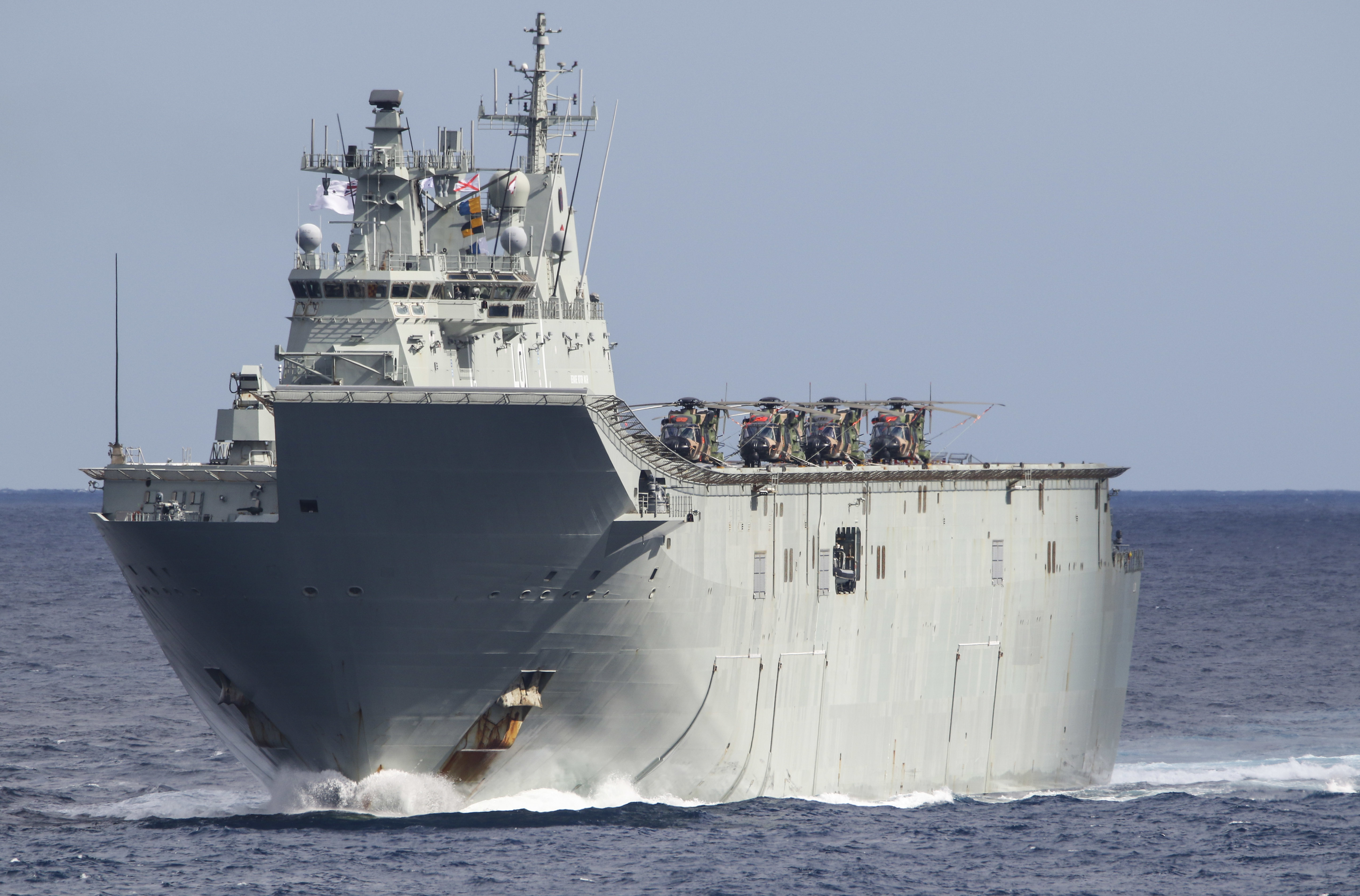
HMAS Canberra. Most modern helicopter carriers are amphibious assault ships.

A helicopter carrier is a type of aircraft carrier whose primary purpose is to operate helicopters. It has a large flight deck that occupies a substantial part of the deck, which can extend the full length of the ship like HMS Ocean of the Royal Navy (RN) (Note: As of 2018 called NAM Atlântico, part of the Brazilian Navy), or extend only partway, usually aft, as in the Soviet Navy's Moskva class or in the Chinese Navy's Type 0891A. It often also has a hangar deck for the storage and maintenance of rotorwing aircraft.

Pure helicopter carriers are difficult to define in the 21st century. The advent of STOVL aircraft such as the Harrier jump jet, and now the F-35B, have complicated the classification; the United States Navy's Wasp class, for instance, carries six to eight Harriers as well as over 20 helicopters. Only smaller carriers unable to operate the Harrier, and older, pre-Harrier-era carriers, can be regarded as true helicopter carriers. In many cases, other carriers, able to operate STOVL aircraft, are classified as "light aircraft carriers". Other vessels, such as the Wasp class, are also capable of embarking troops such as marines and landing them ashore; they are classified as landing helicopter docks.

Helicopter carriers have been used as anti-submarine warfare carriers and amphibious assault ships.

HMS Hermes and two of her sisters were 22,000 ton fleet carriers converted to "commando carriers" only able to operate helicopters. Hermes was later converted to a STOVL carrier.

== Helicopter carriers by country ==
Country	Navy	In service	In reserve	Fitting out	Under construction
Australia	Royal Australian Navy	2	0	0	0
Brazil	Brazilian Navy	1	0	0	0
China	People's Liberation Army Navy	4	1	0	0 (8 planned total)
Egypt	Egyptian Navy	2	0	0	0
France	French Navy	3	0	0	0
India	Indian Navy	0	0	0	0 (4 planned total)
Italy	Italian Navy	2	0	0	1
Japan	Japan Maritime Self-Defense Force	4	0	0	0
Portugal	Portuguese Navy	0	0	0	1
Qatar	Qatari Emiri Navy	0	0	1	0
Russia	Russian Navy	0	0	0	2 (3 planned total)
South Korea	Republic of Korea Navy	2	0	0	0
Spain	Spanish Navy	1	0	0	0
Thailand	Royal Thai Navy	1	0	0	0
Turkey	Turkish Naval Forces	1	0	0	0
United States	United States Navy	9	3	0	2 (11 planned total)

== Helicopter carriers ==
=== Helicopter carriers currently in service ===
Country	Name	Length	Tonnage (MT)	Class	Propulsion	Type	Classification	Commission
Australia	Canberra	230.82 m (757 ft 3 in)	27,500 t (27,100 long tons)	Canberra (modified Juan Carlos I)	Conventional	STOVL	Landing helicopter dock	28 November 2014
Australia	Adelaide	230.82 m (757 ft 3 in)	27,500 t (27,100 long tons)	Canberra (modified Juan Carlos I)	Conventional	STOVL	Landing helicopter dock	4 December 2015
Brazil	Atlântico	203.4 m (667 ft 4 in)	21,500 t (21,200 long tons)	Ocean	Conventional	VTOL	Multipurpose helicopter carrier	29 June 2018
China	Hainan	232 m (761 ft 2 in)	36,000 t (35,000 long tons)	Type 075 (NATO reporting name Yushen class)	Conventional	VTOL	Landing helicopter dock	23 April 2021
China	Guangxi	232 m (761 ft 2 in)	36,000 t (35,000 long tons)	Type 075 (NATO reporting name Yushen class)	Conventional	VTOL	Landing helicopter dock	26 December 2021
China	Anhui	232 m (761 ft 2 in)	36,000 t (35,000 long tons)	Type 075 (NATO reporting name Yushen class)	Conventional	VTOL	Landing helicopter dock	1 October 2022
China	Hubei	232 m (761 ft 2 in)	36,000 t (35,000 long tons)	Type 075 (NATO reporting name Yushen class)	Conventional	VTOL	Landing helicopter dock	1 August 2025
Egypt	Gamal Abdel Nasser	199 m (652 ft 11 in)	21,300 t (21,000 long tons)	Mistral	Conventional	VTOL	Landing helicopter dock	2 June 2016
Egypt	Anwar El Sadat	199 m (652 ft 11 in)	21,300 t (21,000 long tons)	Mistral	Conventional	VTOL	Landing helicopter dock	16 September 2016
France	Mistral	199 m (652 ft 11 in)	21,300 t (21,000 long tons)	Mistral	Conventional	VTOL	Landing helicopter dock	December 2005
France	Tonnerre	199 m (652 ft 11 in)	21,300 t (21,000 long tons)	Mistral	Conventional	VTOL	Landing helicopter dock	December 2006
France	Dixmude	199 m (652 ft 11 in)	21,300 t (21,000 long tons)	Mistral	Conventional	VTOL	Landing helicopter dock	December 2011
Japan	Kaga	248 m (813 ft 8 in)	27,000 t (27,000 long tons)	Izumo	Conventional	VTOL	Helicopter destroyer	22 March 2017
Japan	Izumo	248 m (813 ft 8 in)	27,000 t (27,000 long tons)	Izumo	Conventional	VTOL	Helicopter destroyer	25 March 2015
Japan	Hyūga	197 m (646 ft 4 in)	19,000 t (19,000 long tons)	Hyūga	Conventional	VTOL	Helicopter destroyer	18 March 2009
Japan	Ise	197 m (646 ft 4 in)	19,000 t (19,000 long tons)	Hyūga	Conventional	VTOL	Helicopter destroyer	16 March 2011
South Korea	Dokdo	199 m (652 ft 11 in)	18,800 t (18,500 long tons)	Dokdo	Conventional	VTOL	Landing platform helicopter	3 July 2007
South Korea	Marado	199 m (652 ft 11 in)	18,800 t (18,500 long tons)	Dokdo	Conventional	VTOL	Landing platform helicopter	28 June 2021
Spain	Juan Carlos I	230.82 m (757 ft 3 in)	27,079 t (26,651 long tons)	Juan Carlos I	Conventional	STOVL	Landing helicopter dock	30 September 2010
Thailand	Chakri Naruebet	182.65 m (599 ft 3 in)	11,486 t (11,305 long tons)	Príncipe de Asturias	Conventional	STOVL	Helicopter carrier ("Light aircraft carrier")	27 March 1997
Turkey	Anadolu	232 m (761 ft 2 in)	27,079 t (26,651 long tons)	Anadolu	Conventional	STOVL	Landing helicopter dock	10 April 2023
US	America	257.3 m (844 ft 2 in)	45,000 t (44,000 long tons)	America	Conventional	VTOL	Landing helicopter assault	11 October 2014
US	Tripoli	257.3 m (844 ft 2 in)	45,000 t (44,000 long tons)	America	Conventional	VTOL	Landing helicopter assault	15 July 2020
US	Wasp	257 m (843 ft 2 in)	40,532 t (39,892 long tons)	Wasp	Conventional	VTOL	Landing helicopter dock	29 July 1989
US	Essex	257 m (843 ft 2 in)	40,650 t (40,010 long tons)	Wasp	Conventional	VTOL	Landing helicopter dock	17 October 1992
US	Kearsarge	257 m (843 ft 2 in)	40,500 t (39,900 long tons)	Wasp	Conventional	VTOL	Landing helicopter dock	16 October 1993
US	Boxer	257 m (843 ft 2 in)	40,722 t (40,079 long tons)	Wasp	Conventional	VTOL	Landing helicopter dock	11 February 1995
US	Bataan	257 m (843 ft 2 in)	40,358 t (39,721 long tons)	Wasp	Conventional	VTOL	Landing helicopter dock	20 September 1997
US	Iwo Jima	257 m (843 ft 2 in)	40,530 t (39,890 long tons)	Wasp	Conventional	VTOL	Landing helicopter dock	30 June 2001
US	Makin Island	258 m (846 ft 5 in)	41,649 t (40,991 long tons)	Wasp	Conventional	VTOL	Landing helicopter dock	24 October 2009

=== Retired helicopter carriers ===
- (United Kingdom) Albion (Royal Navy) – converted from light carrier and operating in helicopter carrier role from 1962 to 1973
- (Italy) Andrea Doria (Italian Navy) – an Andrea Doria-class helicopter cruiser active from 1964 to 1992
- Bonhomme Richard (United States Navy) – Wasp-class landing helicopter dock, active 1998–2020
- (United Kingdom) Bulwark (Royal Navy) – converted from light carrier and operating in helicopter carrier role from 1960 to 1981
- (Italy) Caio Duilio (Italian Navy) - an Andrea Doria-class helicopter cruiser active from 1964 to 1989
- (United States) Cobb (US Coast Guard), decommissioned in 1946 – world's first helicopter carrier.
- (United Kingdom) Illustrious (Royal Navy) – an Invincible-class light aircraft carrier, which operated as a helicopter carrier when HMS Ocean was being refitted.
- Iwo Jima (United States Navy) – lead of the seven-ship Iwo Jima class, active from the early 1960s to the early 2000s
- (France) Jeanne d'Arc (French Navy), decommissioned in 2010
- (Soviet Union) Leningrad (Soviet Navy) – second of the two-ship Moskva class - active 1969–1991
- (Soviet Union) Moskva (Soviet Navy) – lead of the two-ship Moskva class, active 1967–1991
- (United Kingdom) ex-Ocean (Royal Navy) – helicopter carrier 1998–2018, decommissioned March 2018.
  - Sold to Brazil in February 2018, renamed Atlântico
- (Italy) Vittorio Veneto (Italian Navy) – a helicopter cruiser active from 1969 to 2003

== See also ==
- Amphibious transport dock
- Amphibious warfare ship
- Aviation-capable naval vessel
- List of STOVL carriers
- VSTOL Support Ship
- Light aircraft carrier
- Landing helicopter assault
