= AR-2000 =

Chinese unmammed combat aerial vehicle

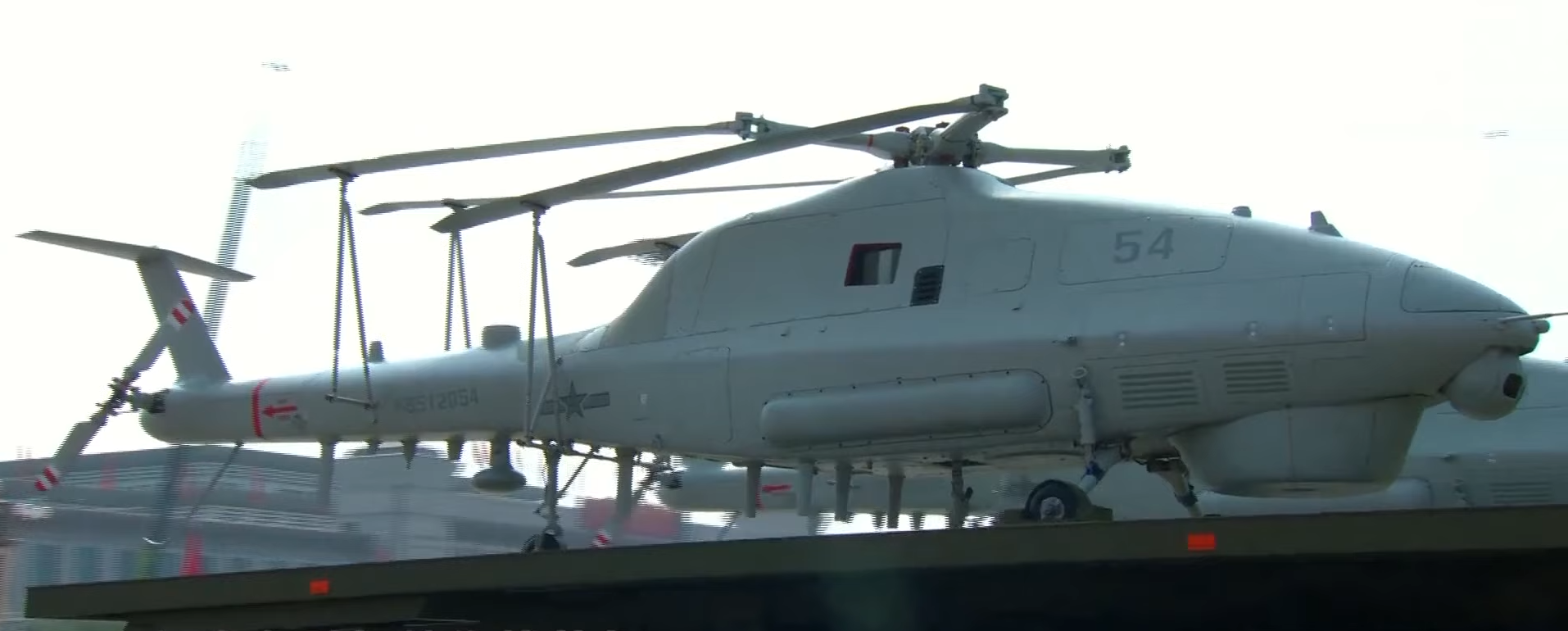
- AR-2000 at 2025 China Victory Parade

General information
- Type: Unmanned combat aerial vehicle
- National origin: People's Republic of China
- Manufacturer: Aviation Industry Corporation of China
- Status: In Service
- Primary user: People's Liberation Army Navy

History
- First flight: 2023

The AR-2000 (Chinese: 旋戈-2000; pinyin: Xuán gē-liǎng qiān) is an unmanned autonomous helicopter developed in the People's Republic of China for the People's Liberation Army. Designed for reconnaissance, surveillance, and precision strike missions, the AR-2000 can be operated by multiple service branches, including the PLA Ground Force, Navy, and Air Force.

== History and development ==
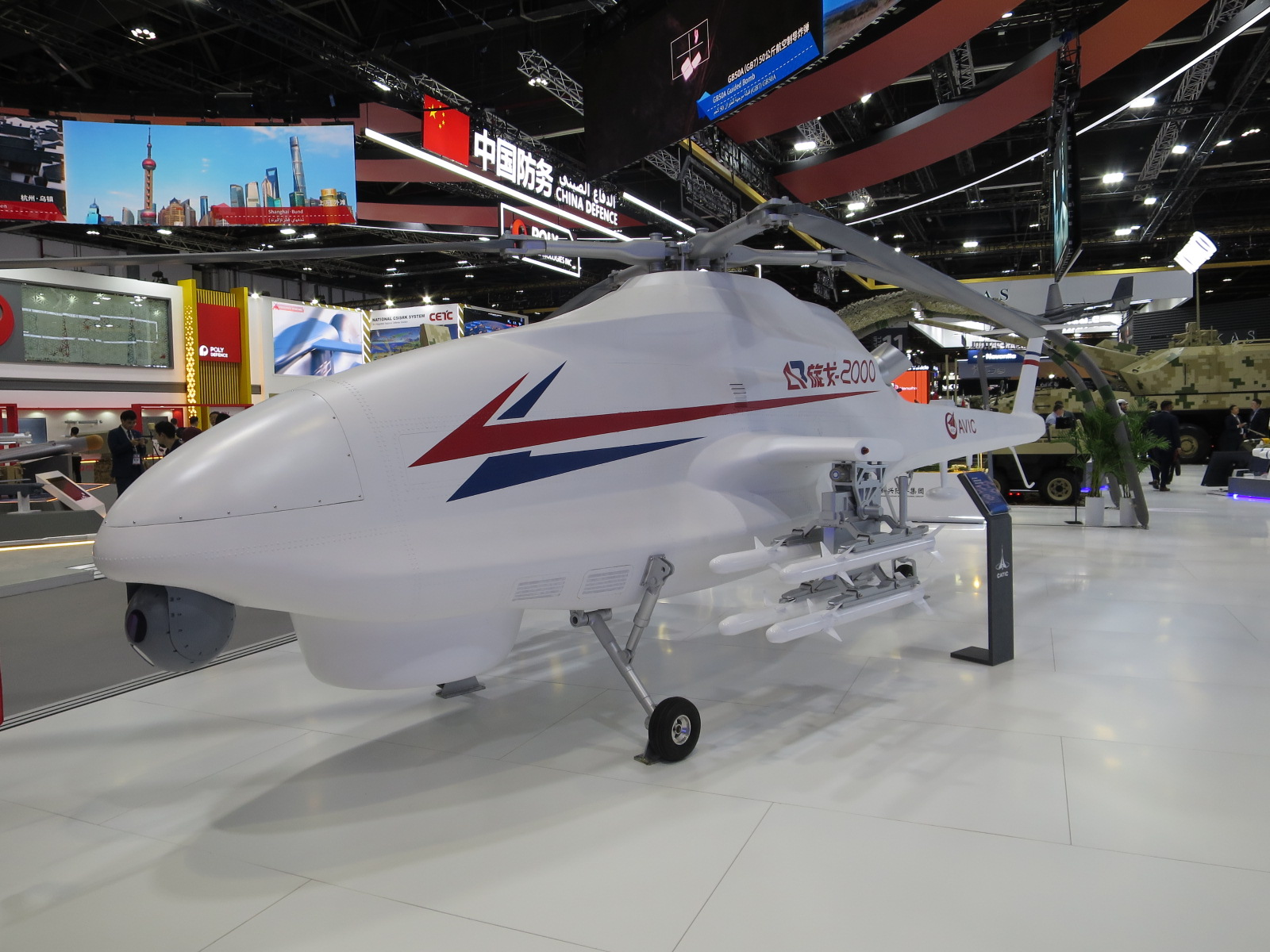
AR-2000 mockup at IDEX 2025 expo

AR-2000 was the second unmanned rotary-wing vehicle developed by China, after the smaller AR-500W (export designation U8EW), which was revealed at the 2018 Singapore Airshow and took maiden flight in May 2020. The AR-2000 is an enlarged AR-500 with better capabilities and optimization for shipborne operations. The aircraft took its maiden flight in early 2023. The AR-2000 was debuted on the Dubai Airshow 2023, with the vendor China National Aero-Technology Import & Export Corporation (CATIC) confirming the PLA has already procured the aircraft.

The PLA service version of the AR-2000 was showcased on the 2025 China Victory Day Parade. It entered service with PLA Navy in 2025 and was deployed on the Type 075 amphibious assault ship. The operation role of the AR-2000 is likely reconnaissance, surveillance, strike, and anti-submarine missions in the South China Sea and Taiwan Strait.

== Design ==
The size of AR-2000 is slightly smaller than that of Harbin Z-20, with a weight of 4,400 lb (2,000 kg). The helicopter is powered by a turboshaft engine with four folding rotor blades. It is equipped with a chin-mounted turret housing electro‑optical/infrared sensors, multiple radar systems embedded in the fuselage, and hardpoints for mounting pylons. Two satcom antennas, one on the nose and one on the tailboom, are visible. Antennae for tactical data links and other communications systems are also visible around the aircraft. The aircraft can also carry PL-9 short-range air-to-air missiles (AAM), anti-tank missiles, and anti-ship weaponry.

== See also ==
Aircraft of comparable role, configuration, and era

- Airbus Helicopters VSR700
- Leonardo Proteus
- Northrop Grumman MQ-8C Fire Scout

Related lists

- List of Chinese aircraft
- List of unmanned aerial vehicles of the People's Republic of China

== Operators ==
China

- People's Liberation Army Navy
