= AN/ZPY-1 =

UAS synthetic aperture surveillance radar

- Country of origin: United States
- Manufacturer: Northrop Grumman
- Type: Solid-state synthetic aperture radar
- Power: 750 W peak

The Northrop Grumman AN/ZPY-1 STARLite Small Tactical Radar - Lightweight is a small, lightweight synthetic aperture/GMTI radar used in tactical operations. The radar is under contract to the U.S. Army Communications and Electronics Command for its Extended Range Multi-Purpose (ERMP) General Atomics MQ-1C Gray Eagle Unmanned Aerial System and is manufactured by Northrop Grumman. STARLite weighs 65 pounds (29 kg), occupies 1.2 cubic feet (34 L), and requires less than 750 W of power. The Army began to take delivery of the system in 2010. Also in 2010 the system was ready for deployment to the battlefield.

From the first orders in 2008 to October 2012, Northrop Grumman delivered half of the 174 radars ordered. Eighteen of the radars on order are a lighter, extended-range version. Weight was reduced by combining the radar power supply and processor and incorporating a Systron Donner inertial system. The new system weights 45 lb (20 kg). The patch antenna was replaced with a slot antenna, doubling its range to 10 mi (16 km). The original STARLite radar is used on the MQ-1C Gray Eagle and the Lockheed Martin Persistent Threat Detection System (PTDS) aerostat. The company is proposing the lighter version for integration onto small UAVs, including the RQ-7B Shadow, the MQ-8C Fire Scout, and the TigerShark UAS. Other potential customers include the Department of Homeland Security, which flies the MQ-1 Predator and MQ-9 Guardian, and NATO countries. The active electronically scanned radar is mounted on a rotating mechanical gimbal with a 360 degree field of regard, although the antenna itself has a 110 degree field of view. In addition to SAR/GMTI, it has a dismount moving target indicator mode that can track a person walking on the ground from a range of 4.3 nmi (8.0 km; 4.9 mi).

In accordance with the Joint Electronics Type Designation System (JETDS), the "AN/ZPY-1" designation represents the first design of an Army-Navy electronic device for piloted or pilotless airborne vehicle surveillance radar. The JETDS system also now is used to name all Department of Defense electronic systems.

== See also ==
- List of military electronics of the United States
