= Chinese landing helicopter dock Guangxi =

Amphibious assault ship commissioned in 2021

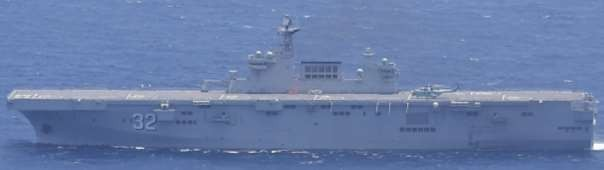
- Guangxi in 2023

History

China
- Name: Guangxi; (广西)
- Namesake: Guangxi
- Launched: April 2020
- Commissioned: December 2021
- Home port: Zhoushan
- Identification: Pennant number: 32
- Motto: "攻有所取, 攻无不克" ("Everywhere we attack we take, everyone we attack gets conquered".)
- Status: Active
- Badge: See #Emblem

General characteristics
- Class & type: Type 075 landing helicopter dock
- Displacement: 36,000 t (35,000 long tons) (full load)
- Length: 232 m (761 ft 2 in)
- Beam: 36.8 m (120 ft 9 in)
- Boats & landing craft carried: Type 726 LCAC
- Capacity: 35 armored vehicles
- Troops: 1,200 troops
- Complement: 1,100 crew
- Armament: 2 × H/PJ-11 30 mm (1.2 in) CIWS; 2 × HQ-10 SAM
- Aircraft carried: 30 helicopters per dock
- Aviation facilities: Hangar and flight deck

Guangxi (32) is the second ship of the Type 075 landing helicopter docks of the Chinese People's Liberation Army Navy (PLAN). She is part of the East Sea Fleet and is stationed in Zhoushan.

The ship's motto is Chinese: 攻有所取, 攻无不克, which roughly translates to "Everywhere we attack we take, everyone we attack gets conquered".

== Design ==
Guangxi can carry 35 armored vehicles and 30 helicopters. It also carries Type 726 LCACs.

== History ==
Guangxi was launched in April 2020 and was commissioned in December 2021. Her existence was officially confirmed on April 21, 2022.

The incumbent commanding officer of Guangxi is Captain Xu Ce (许策), who was formerly the captain of the destroyer Nanjing.

== Emblem ==
The emblem of Guangxi has the characters "中国人民解放军海军广西舰" (Chinese PLAN ship Guangxi) at the top and the ship's motto at the bottom. In between, there is a drawing of Guangxi where the island has been replaced with the "桂" character, which is the Chinese abbreviation for the Guangxi.

Insignia of the Guangxi
- Emblem of the Guangxi https://web.archive.org/web/20250225115858im_/http://gjw.gxzf.gov.cn/xwdt/gzdt/W020220628075568082753.jpg
- Logo of the Guangxi: https://web.archive.org/web/20250225115858im_/http://gjw.gxzf.gov.cn/xwdt/gzdt/W020220628075568306940.jpg

== See also ==
- Chinese landing helicopter dock Hainan
