= Italian landing helicopter dock Trieste =

Multipurpose Italian Navy ship

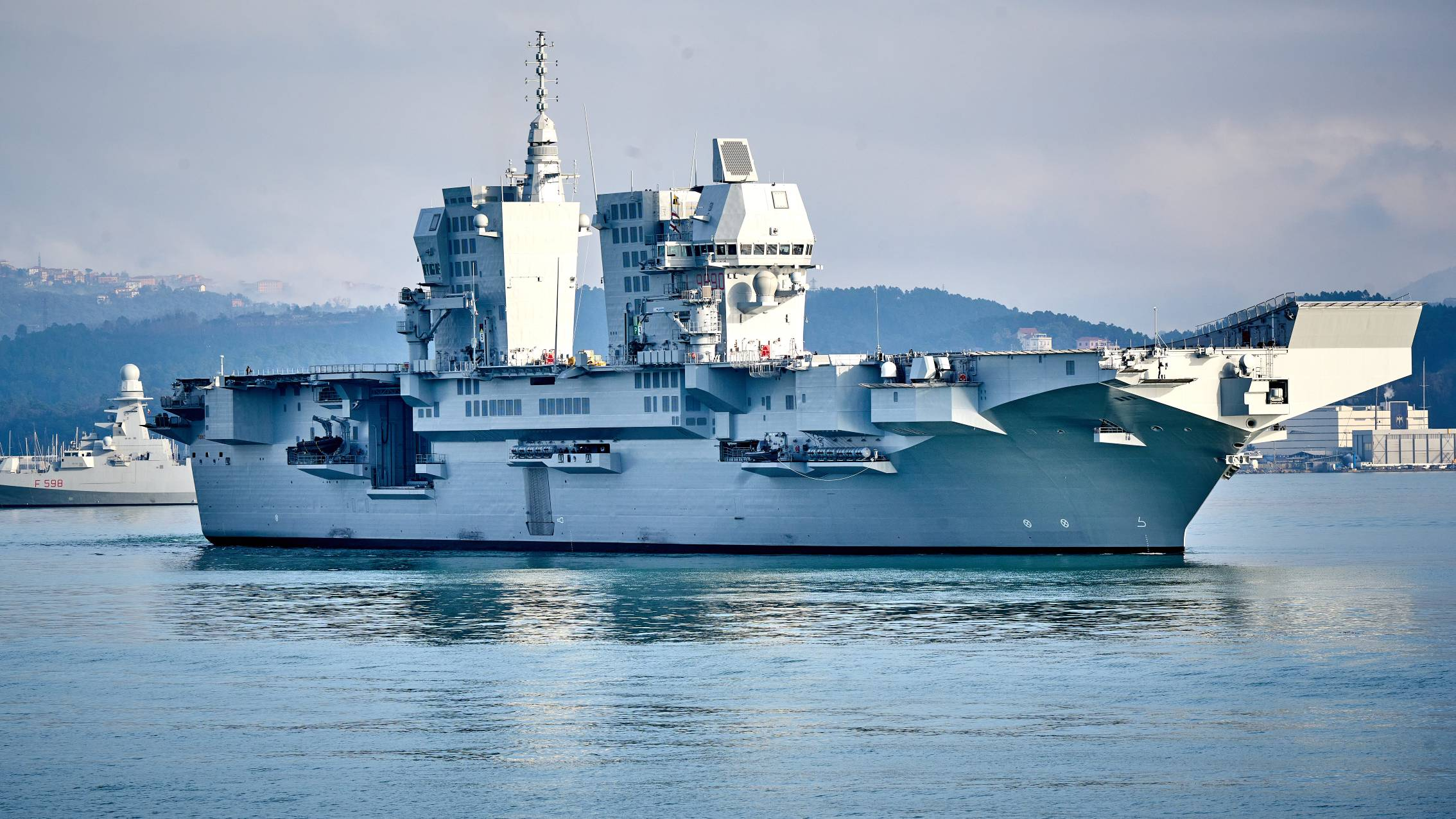
- Trieste at La Spezia following her delivery on 7 December 2024.

History

Italy
- Name: Trieste
- Namesake: Trieste, a city and seaport in northeastern Italy
- Awarded: 3 July 2015
- Builder: Fincantieri, Castellammare di Stabia, Naples, Italy; Cantiere navale del Muggiano, La Spezia, Italy
- Cost: € 1.171 billion
- Yard number: 6260
- Laid down: 20 February 2018
- Launched: 25 May 2019
- Sponsored by: Laura Mattarella
- Commissioned: 7 December 2024
- Identification: Pennant number: L9890

General characteristics
- Type: Landing helicopter dock
- Displacement: 38,000 t (37,000 long tons) full load
- Length: 245 m (803 ft 10 in) LOA; 213.4 m (700 ft 2 in) LPP
- Beam: 47 m (154 ft 2 in)
- Depth: 7.2 m (23 ft 7 in)
- Propulsion: CODOG scheme + electric engines; 2 × Rolls-Royce MT30 gas turbines providing 76,000 kW (102,000 hp); 2 × MAN 20V32/44CR diesel engines, 24,000 kW (32,000 hp); 4 × diesel engines generators MAN 9L32/44CR, 20,960 kW (28,110 hp); 2 × 2,250 kW (3,020 hp) electric engines; 2 × shaft
- Speed: 25 knots (46 km/h; 29 mph) on TAGs; 18 knots (33 km/h; 21 mph) on diesel engines; 10 kn (19 km/h; 12 mph) on electric engines
- Range: 7,000 nmi (13,000 km; 8,100 mi) to 16 knots (30 km/h; 18 mph)
- Endurance: 30 days
- Complement: 460 crew; 604 marines component; (max 1043 + 21)
- Sensors & processing systems: Leonardo CMS SADOC Mk4; 1 × Leonardo Kronos Dual Band, AESA 3D DBR 4FF, only with X-band radar (Kronos StarFire); 1 × Leonardo Kronos Power Shield, AESA LRR L-band radar; 1 × Leonardo conformal IFF; 1 × Leonardo Black Snake, anti torpedo towed array sonar; 1 × TACAN; 1 × PAR (Precision Approach Radar) Leonardo SPN-720
- Electronic warfare & decoys: integrated EW System by Elettronica Spa with RESM/RECM/CESM and ELINT/COMINT capabilities
- Armament: 3 × Oto Melara 76 mm/62 Strales anti-aircraft guns; 3 × OTO Melara 25/80 RCWS with Oerlikon KBA 25 mm; 2 × Oto Melara ODLS-20 (decoys launchers); FFBNW 4 × 8-cell SYLVER A50 VLS for 32 Aster 15 and 30 missiles
- Aircraft carried: usually 12 × AgustaWestland AW101 or combination with SH90A, AgustaWestland AW129D and F-35B
- Notes: 50 m × 15 m (164 ft 1 in × 49 ft 3 in) dock, for 4 × 70 t LCU or 1 LCAC; 55 m × 18 m (180 ft 5 in × 59 ft 1 in) garage decks for vehicles (1,200 m (3,937 ft 0 in) for parking vehicles); 21 m (68 ft 11 in) (25 m × 107 m (82 ft 0 in × 351 ft 1 in)) hangar (up to 2,600 m^{2} (28,000 sq ft)) for up to 14 AgustaWestland AW101 or combination with SH90A, AgustaWestland AW129D and F-35B (or 530 m (1,738 ft 10 in) for parking vehicles); flight deck 230 m × 36 m (754 ft 7 in × 118 ft 1 in); flight deck with up to 9 spots for AW101 or combination with SH90A helicopters, AgustaWestland AW129D; Role 2E NATO standard hospital (700 m^{2} (7,500 sq ft)) with 28 beds

Trieste is a multi-purpose landing helicopter dock (LHD) of the Italian Navy. The ship replaced the aircraft carrier Giuseppe Garibaldi and is the largest vessel in the Italian fleet. She was ordered as part of the 2014–2015 naval program and was built at the Castellammare di Stabia shipyards of Fincantieri. On 7 December 2024, the ship was commissioned at the Italian Navy's base in Livorno.

== Project and construction ==
As part of the units planned under the 2014–2015 naval law, the new multi-role/multi-function amphibious ship has a full load displacement of approximately 38,000 tons and an overall length of about 245 meters (803 ft 10 in), making it the largest unit in the fleet. It features two distinct islands, the first (at the bow) for navigation and the second (at the stern) for the management and control of flight operations. This configuration serves a triple purpose, providing a greater visual range, more space on the flight deck, and a more efficient management of various activities.

The flight deck has a length of 230 meters (754 ft 7 in) and a width of 36 meters (118 ft 1 in), with a total of nine spots for aircraft. It is equipped with two 15-by-15-meter (49 by 49 ft) aircraft elevators with a maximum capacity of 42 tons.

Trieste is equipped with a floodable well deck below the hangar, which allows the use of amphibious vehicles such as Landing Craft Mechanized (LCM), rigid-hull inflatable boats (RHIB), Landing Craft Air Cushion hovercraft, L-CAC, and the most innovative rapid amphibious landing vehicles (L-CAT) used by NATO and European navies. Unlike the aircraft carrier Cavour, which has a single reconfigurable hangar not floodable for vehicle transport, this unit has, below the flight deck, two additional decks, one of which is a hangar with an area of 2,300 m^{2} (25,000 sq ft) and 530 linear meters for vehicle parking with removable bulkheads to reach 2,600 m^{2} (28,000 sq ft), connected to a lower deck of 2,200 m^{2} (24,000 sq ft), divided into a garage of 700 m^{2} (7,500 sq ft) with 253 linear meters for vehicle parking and a floodable 55 by 15 m (180 by 49 ft) well deck, sized for the entry of four LCM-1E or one LCAC.

Like Cavour and Giuseppe Garibaldi, Trieste also features a ski-jump on the flight deck to facilitate the takeoff of STOVL F-35B aircraft, as reported in the technical specifications, maintaining secondary air capability to be used in case of necessity when Cavour is not available.

The propulsion group has two shafts with variable-pitch five-bladed propellers and two balanced spade rudders, two retractable stabilizer fins, two forward thrusters, and one aft thruster, ensuring greater maneuverability in confined spaces compared to just rudders/propellers.

The first steel plate was cut on 12 July 2017, at the Fincantieri shipyard in Castellammare di Stabia, and a little over seven months later, on 20 February 2018, the keel was laid at the shipyard's slipway, marking the start of the ship's construction. The ship was launched and christened on 25 May 2019, in the presence of the President Sergio Mattarella, with his daughter serving as the ship's godmother. The first sea trial took place on 12 August 2021, off the coast of La Spezia. Three Fincantieri shipyards were involved: the hull was constructed in Castellammare di Stabia, the outfitting was carried out in Muggiano, and the hull maintenance was performed in Palermo.

== Design ==
=== Armament and sensors ===
The ship is equipped with state-of-the-art weapon systems. Trieste is fitted with three multi-role Otobreda 76/62 guns (two at the bow and one at the stern) configured as Super Rapid guns with the Strales system and guided ammunition, including provisions for the new Vulcano ammunition. For additional defense, the ship has three remotely controlled OTO Melara 25/80 remote weapon systems equipped with a 25 mm Oerlikon KBA cannon and two OTO Melara ODLS-20 rocket launchers for launching underwater and aerial decoys. Trieste is fitted for but not with four Sylver A50 vertical launch systems with eight cells each, for a total capacity of 32 Aster 15/30 missiles.

Trieste features an advanced sensor suite consisting of the PAR SPN-720, a precision approach radar, a 3D volumetric system capable of tracking 300 tracks and 12 targets simultaneously, with a range exceeding 200 km (120 mi), Radar Kronos Power Shield (AESA in L-band), a multifunction surveillance system with a range of 1,500–2,000 km (930–1,240 mi), IFF SIR-M-PA, a secondary radar for ship and aircraft identification, Dual-band Radar Kronos (DBR AESA 4FF): C-band (Kronos Quad - Fitted For) and X-band (Kronos StarFire), TACAN AN-553/N, for precision approach and sending information to aircraft in flight, "Zeus" EWS (Electronic Warfare System), developed by Elettronica SpA, equipped with a solid-state GaN TRX-based electronic attack subsystem. The EW component is integrated with a Radar Emitter Locator (RE), Radar Countermeasures (RCM), and Radio Communications Countermeasures (RCCM), effective in both open sea and coastal waters. It provides advanced maritime surveillance and situational assessment through ELINT and COMINT, along with an algorithm SEI, and Automatic combat operations direction system SADOC 4.

=== Airwing ===
The ship features a flight deck measuring 230 by 36 metres (755 by 118 ft), covering an area of approximately 7,400 m^{2} (80,000 sq ft), with nine takeoff spots for heavy helicopters or F-35B fighter jets. Flight deck operations are controlled from the aft island. In full operational conditions, the ship can carry a total of 30–34 aircraft in various combinations of jets and helicopters. In fact, with an area of 2,600 m^{2} (28,000 sq ft) (compared to the 2,500 m^{2}, 27,000 sq ft of Cavour), is designed to accommodate a maximum of 14 aircraft, also in various configurations. There are two 15-by-15-metre (49 by 49 ft) elevators at the stern each with a maximum load of 42 tons.

=== Amphibious capabilities ===
The ship's amphibious capabilities are highly advanced, and they serve as the primary weapon of the unit. The second deck, below the hangar, with an area of 2,300 m^{2} (25,000 sq ft), features a floodable well deck measuring 55 by 15 m (180 by 49 ft), designed to accommodate four LCMs, referred to as LC23, or one LCAC / LCAT. The LCMs will be able to transport one Ariete tank, five Iveco LMV Lynx vehicles, or one Centauro, one Freccia, or 300 soldiers.

=== Hospital ===
The ship is also equipped with a fully equipped hospital, including operating rooms, radiology and analysis laboratories, a dental clinic, and a ward for 28 seriously ill patients, covering a total area of 700 square metres (7,500 sq ft). Additional beds will be accommodated in specially prepared container modules.

In May 2019, the ship was launched at the Castellammare di Stabia shipyards and transferred to La Spezia for final outfitting. The initial delivery was expected by 2022, but it was later postponed to the end of 2023. The construction phase involved over 300 workers, while the installation and completion phase is expected to engage 800 people.

== Service history ==
Trieste participated in a Passage Exercise (PASSEX) with INS Tamal of the Indian Navy before the latter called at the Port of Naples in Italy between 13 and 16 August 2025. Tamal's port call follows the upgrade of both the country's bilateral ties to Strategic Partnership in 2023 through the India-Italy Strategic Action Plan 2025–2029.

== See also ==
- Italian Naval Aviation
- List of aircraft carriers in service

Equivalent amphibious warfare ships of the same era

- America class
- Type 075
- Canberra class
- Juan Carlos I class
- Project 23900
- Anadolu class
