= Northrop Grumman MQ-8C Fire Scout =

Unmanned Helicopter

MQ-8C Fire Scout
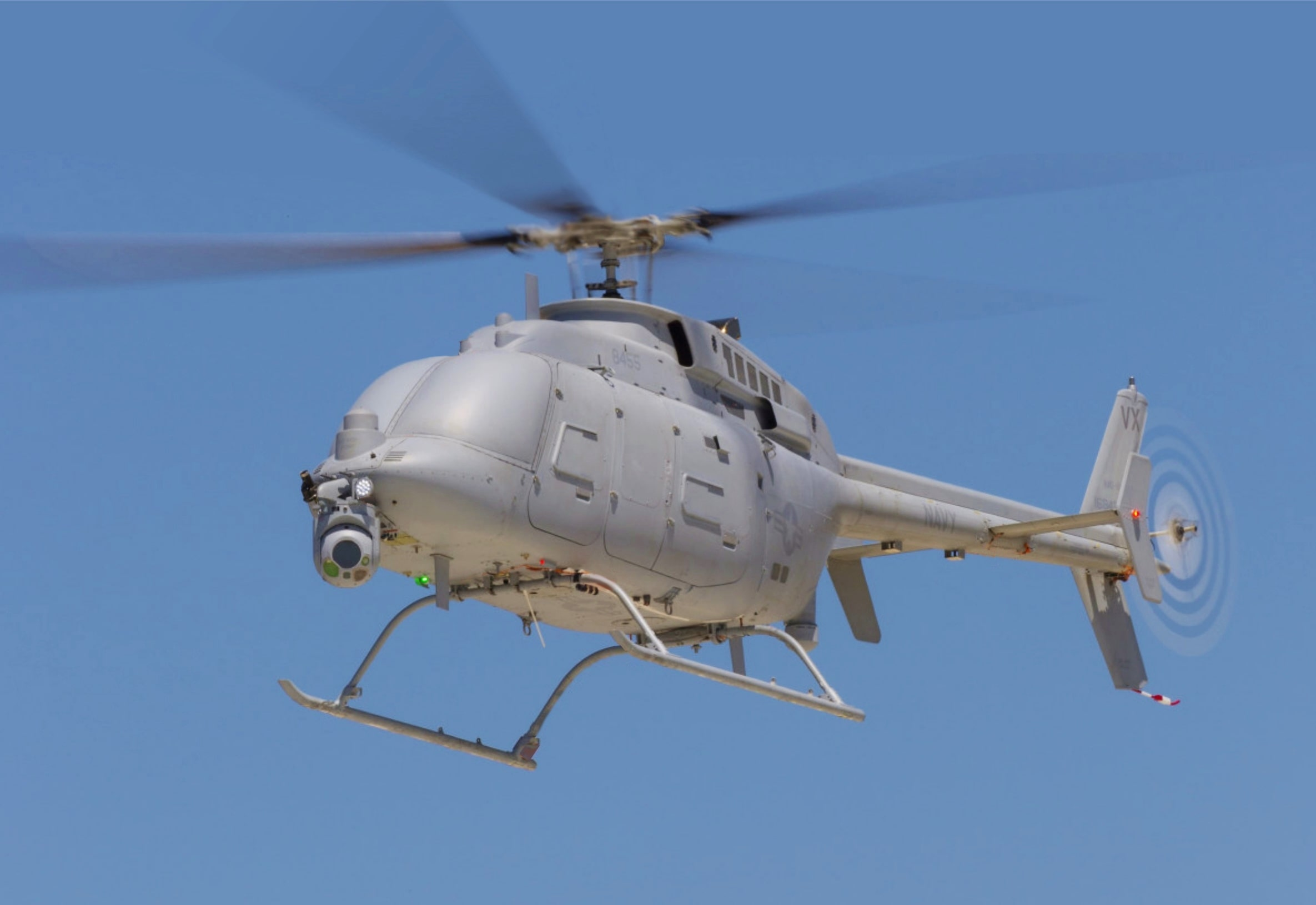
- An MQ-8C landing at NAS Point Mugu

General information
- Type: UAV helicopter
- Manufacturer: Northrop Grumman; Bell Helicopter
- Status: Development testing
- Primary user: United States Navy
- Number built: 38

History
- Introduction date: 2019
- First flight: 2013
- Developed from: Bell 407; Northrop Grumman MQ-8 Fire Scout

The Northrop Grumman MQ-8C Fire Scout (known as the Fire-X during development) is an unmanned helicopter developed by Northrop Grumman for use by the United States Navy. The MQ-8C has autonomous take-off and landing capability. It is designed to provide reconnaissance, situational awareness, aerial fire support and precision targeting support for ground, air and sea forces.

The MQ-8C airframe is based on the Bell 407, with the avionics and other systems developed from the MQ-8B Fire Scout. It first flew in October 2013 and achieved initial operational capability in June 2019.

== Design and development ==
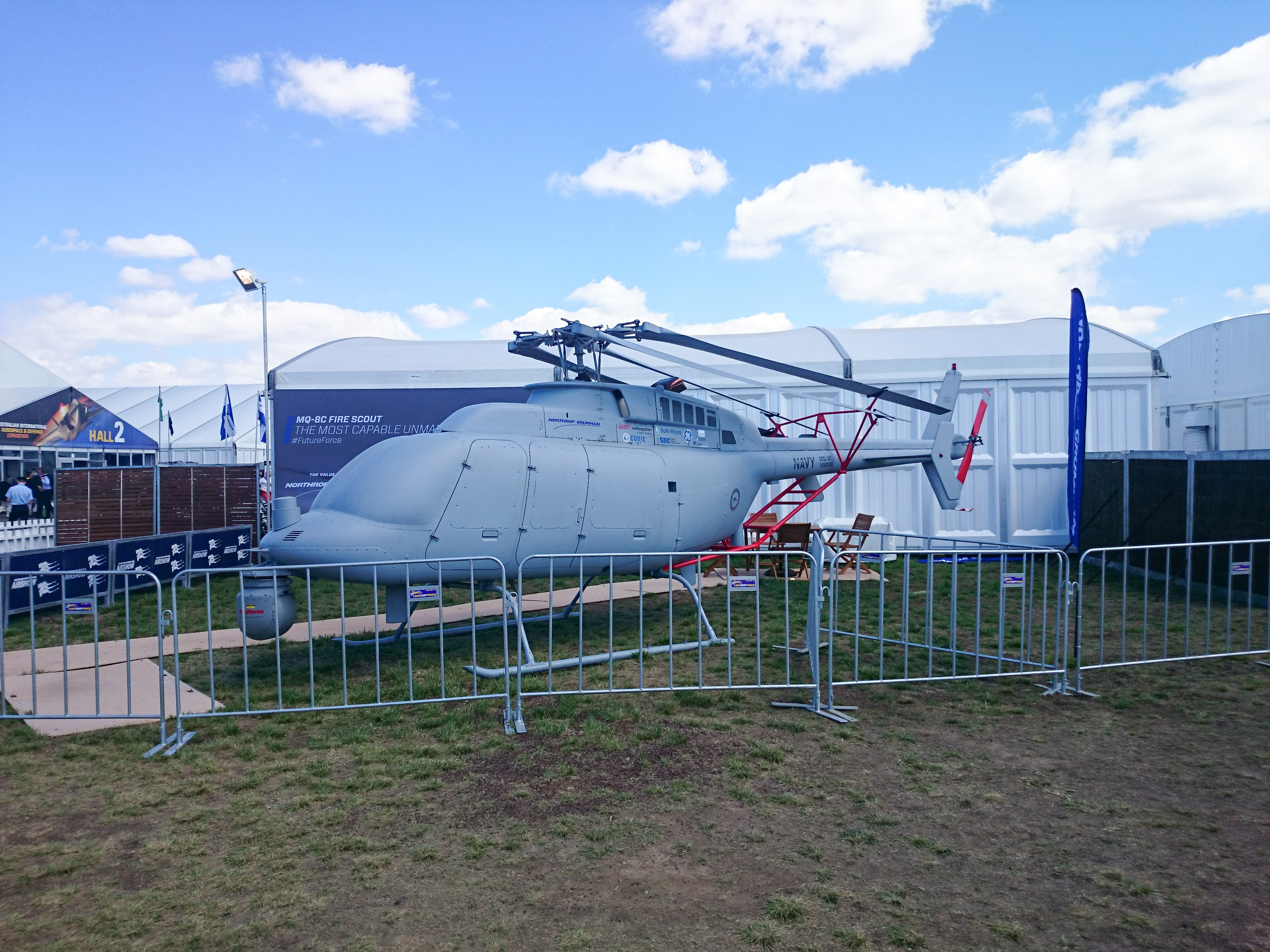
A MQ-8C Fire Scout on display at the 2015 Australian International Airshow

In May 2010, Northrop Grumman announced plans to fly a Bell 407 helicopter modified with autonomous controls from the MQ-8B. Named Fire-X, it was to demonstrate an unmanned cargo resupply capability to the US Navy. In December 2010, the unmanned Fire-X completed its first flight at Yuma Proving Ground in Arizona. In April 2012, Northrop Grumman received a $262.3 million contract from the Navy to build the newly designated MQ-8C Fire Scout. The work included two developmental aircraft and six low-rate production aircraft initially. The Navy wanted 28 MQ-8Cs for naval special operations forces.

In March 2013, the Navy incorporated the Rolls-Royce 250-C47E engine into the MQ-8C for a 5 percent increase in hot and high power, 2 percent reduced fuel consumption, 8 percent increase in rated takeoff power, and better reliability. The Bell 407-based MQ-8C has an endurance of 12 hours, a range of 150 nmi (170 mi; 280 km), and a payload capacity of about 318 kg (701 lb). It has twice the endurance and three times the payload as the MQ-8B.

In early July 2013, Northrop Grumman delivered the first MQ-8C to the Navy. Ground testing was done to ensure that the systems worked properly and communicated with the ground control station prior to conducting the first flight. The MQ-8C shares software, avionics, payloads, and ship ancillary equipment with the MQ-8B. The MQ-8C was expected to fly in early October 2013, and be deployed in late 2014. The APKWS II was to be added to the C-model sometime after 2016, but ship integration issues and limited magazine space put the effort on hold, and it was eventually discarded.

In September 2013, the MQ-8C Fire-X delivered to the Navy turned on its engines for 10 minutes in preparation for first flight. First flight was scheduled for early to mid-October, although the exact date was not determined, as such tests are often delayed by minor system problems. The MQ-8C flight test regime was for six months.

The MQ-8C Fire Scout first flew on 31 October 2013. It flew for 7 minutes in restricted airspace using autonomous controls at Naval Base Ventura County. It flew a second time hours later that day to an altitude of 500 ft. The MQ-8C was jointly operated by Northrop Grumman and the Navy. Northrop Grumman delivered the second MQ-8C in November 2013. They were under contract to build 14 helicopters.

In December 2014, the MQ-8C began testing aboard the destroyer Jason Dunham, executing 22 landings and recoveries in less than four hours. Testing was completed on 19 December, executing 32 takeoffs and recoveries over three flights. The MQ-8C will be ready to perform surface warfare missions in 2018 and mine countermeasure missions in 2020. The aircraft's first deployment is expected for 2016 to give Littoral Combat Ships a 50 nmi (58 mi; 93 km)-radius ISR capability.

Northrop Grumman flew the MQ-8C demonstrator installed with their AN/ZPY-1 STARLite Radar, although there was no requirement for an MQ-8C radar at the time. In July 2014, the Navy began seeking information for a radar for the MQ-8C, with surface search, synthetic aperture radar, inverse SAR, and weather mode capabilities. Although the AN/ZPY-4 has been installed on some B-model Fire Scouts, the larger C-model can accommodate a larger and more powerful radar. The Fire Scout program office investigated whether to equip the airframe to perform more missions, or to focus on manned-unmanned teaming with larger MH-60S/R Seahawk helicopters.

In May 2016, NAVAIR signed a contract for the Osprey 30 lightweight AESA radar for the MQ-8C, the first system of its type to offer full spherical coverage with no moving parts. The 360-degree, 50 kg (110 lb) airborne radar uses fixed panels distributed around the body of aircraft, mounting antennas weighing just over 11 kg (24 lb) each. The radar is classified as the AN/ZPY-8 and will be retrofitted onto the Navy's MQ-8C's.

In December 2014, the first operational MQ-8C was delivered to the US Navy. Its final developmental flight was completed in April 2015, after 450 hours completed in 327 flights. In August 2015, Northrop Grumman demonstrated the MQ-8C's endurance with an 11-hour flight. In November 2015, the MQ-8C completed a 3-week operational assessment period to assess system performance, endurance, and reliability of the unmanned helicopter over 83.4 hours in 11 flights. To date, the aircraft logged 730 flight hours over 427 flights. Ship-based testing is expected to begin in 2017. In July 2018, Air Test and Evaluation Squadron 1 concluded the initial operational test and evaluation of the MQ-8C, conducted aboard the USS Coronado.

In June 2019, the MQ-8C was declared mission capable. In tandem with a change in focus for the LCS involving increasing the ship's lethality, the MQ-8C's role was changed to focus on providing targeting and surveillance data. While the helicopter could carry 7-tube APKWS guided rocket pods, the LCS only has one weapons magazine used to store all the ship's weapons and didn't provide much space for loading weapons onto the aircraft. Instead of being a weapons platform, the MQ-8C will use its long endurance and radar to provide the LCS with enhanced over-the-horizon targeting capabilities.

By January 2023, the U.S. Navy had procured 38 MQ-8Cs. 10 are used for operations while the rest are kept in storage. All are kept on the West Coast operated by Helicopter Sea Combat Squadrons 21 and 23 to support the MCM package of Independence-class LCS.

=== Retirement ===
As of May 2024, the Navy will end operational employment of the MQ-8C at the end of FY2024. Sundown will follow at the end of FY2026.

== Operators ==
United States

- United States Navy

== Specifications ==

Data from Northrop Grumman

General characteristics

- Crew: 0
- Capacity: 2,950 lb (1,338 kg)
- Length: 34 ft 8 in (10.6 m)
- Height: 10 ft 11 in (3.3 m)
- Max takeoff weight: 6,000 lb (2,721 kg)
- Powerplant: 1 × Rolls-Royce 250-C47B , 813 shp (606 kW)
- Main rotor diameter: 36 ft 7 in (11.2 m)

Performance

- Maximum speed: 140 kn (160 mph, 260 km/h)
- Endurance: 15 hours maximum
- Service ceiling: 20,000 ft (6,100 m)

== See also ==
Related development

- Bell 407
- Northrop Grumman MQ-8 Fire Scout

Aircraft of comparable role, configuration, and era

- AR-2000

Related lists

- List of active United States military aircraft
