= Chinese landing helicopter dock Hainan =

Type 075 landing helicopter dock of the PLA Navy

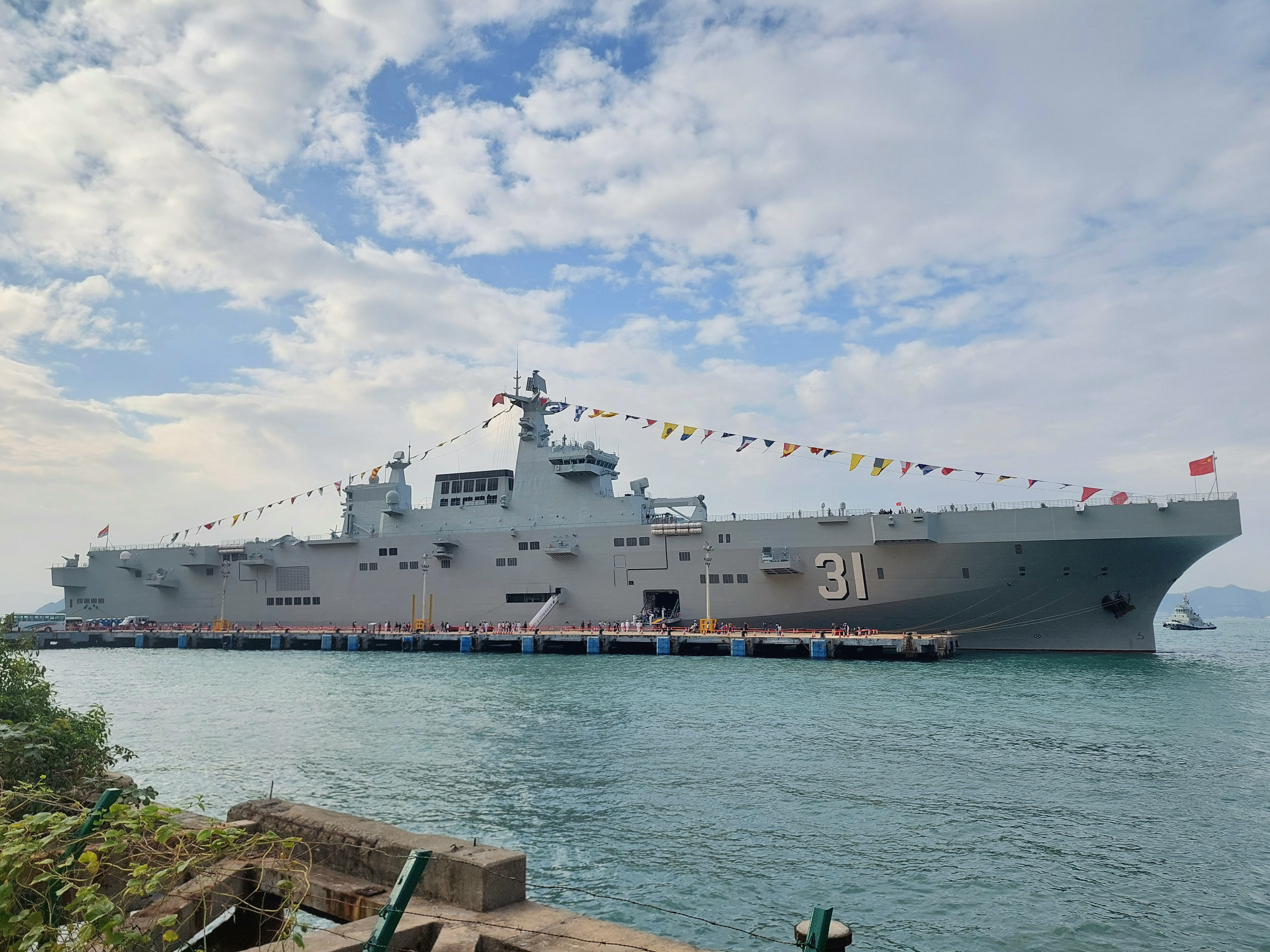
- The landing helicopter dock Hainan in Hong Kong in 2024.

History

China
- Name: Hainan; (海南)
- Namesake: Hainan
- Builder: Hudong Shipyard, Shanghai
- Laid down: 2018
- Launched: 25 September 2019
- Commissioned: 23 April 2021
- Identification: Pennant number: 31
- Status: Active

General characteristics
- Class & type: Type 075 landing helicopter dock
- Displacement: 36,000 tonnes (full load)
- Length: 232 m (761 ft)
- Beam: 36.8 m (120 ft 9 in)
- Capacity: 1,100 crew
- Troops: 1,200 troops
- Armament: 2 × H/PJ-11 30 mm (1.2 in) CIWS; 2 × HQ-10 SAM
- Aircraft carried: 30 attack helicopters per dock
- Aviation facilities: Hangar and flight deck

Hainan (31) is the lead ship of the Type 075 landing helicopter dock of the People's Liberation Army Navy. She was commissioned on 23 April 2021.

== Development and design ==
The Type 075 is a large-scale amphibious assault ship of the Chinese People's Liberation Army Navy. This ship is the largest amphibious warship of the People's Liberation Army Navy. It has a hangar and can carry nearly 30 helicopters of various types. It has a through deck and can take off and land multiple helicopters at the same time. There is a dock, which can be used as a mother ship for amphibious vehicles, landing craft, and air-cushioned landing craft (LCAC), and can transport soldiers, infantry fighting vehicles, tanks, etc. for landing operations.

The Type 075 is China's all-through deck amphibious assault ship. The demonstration work was initiated in 2011. The comprehensive development project was established around 2013.

It was researched and designed by the 708 Research Institute of the China Shipbuilding Industry Corporation; previously almost all amphibious warships of the Chinese Navy were built by the design of the institute, including the Type 071 amphibious transport dock, the Type 072, Type 073, and Type 074 classes of landing ships, and the Type 726 LCAC. After the Type 075 started its program demonstration in 2011, several revisions were made during the period. During this period, the headquarters and the navy had different opinions: In 2016, the General Armed Forces Department recommended that the Type 075 adopt a non-through deck superstructure, but the Chinese Navy insisted on connecting it. Offset deck superstructure (same as all-through decks and offset islands of foreign amphibious assault ships), and finally adopted the navy's opinion and put it into practice.

== Construction and career ==
Hainan was the first ship of the class and laid down in 2018 and launched on 25 September 2019 at the Hudong Shipyard in Shanghai. She suffered a minor fire while fitting out on 11 April 2020. Reportedly, the fire was quickly extinguished and caused minimal damage; construction was apparently not slowed. On 23 April 2021, the ship was commissioned into the South Sea Fleet.

In late January 2023, the PLAN far sea joint training formation, consisting of the amphibious assault ship Hainan, the Type 052D destroyer Hohhot, the guided missile frigate Liuzhou and the fast combat support ship Chaganhu, set sail from Zhanjiang, Guangdong to conduct an extended ("far sea") training cruise in the South China Sea, the Western Pacific and other waters. The cruise lasted a total of 30 days and covered more than 9,000 nautical miles. This was the first time that Hainan was reported publicly as conducting a "far sea" training cruise.

On 21 November 2024, Hainan started a five-day visit in Hong Kong along with the Chinese destroyer Changsha (173). On the 25th, two men were arrested for flying drones near the navy ship.

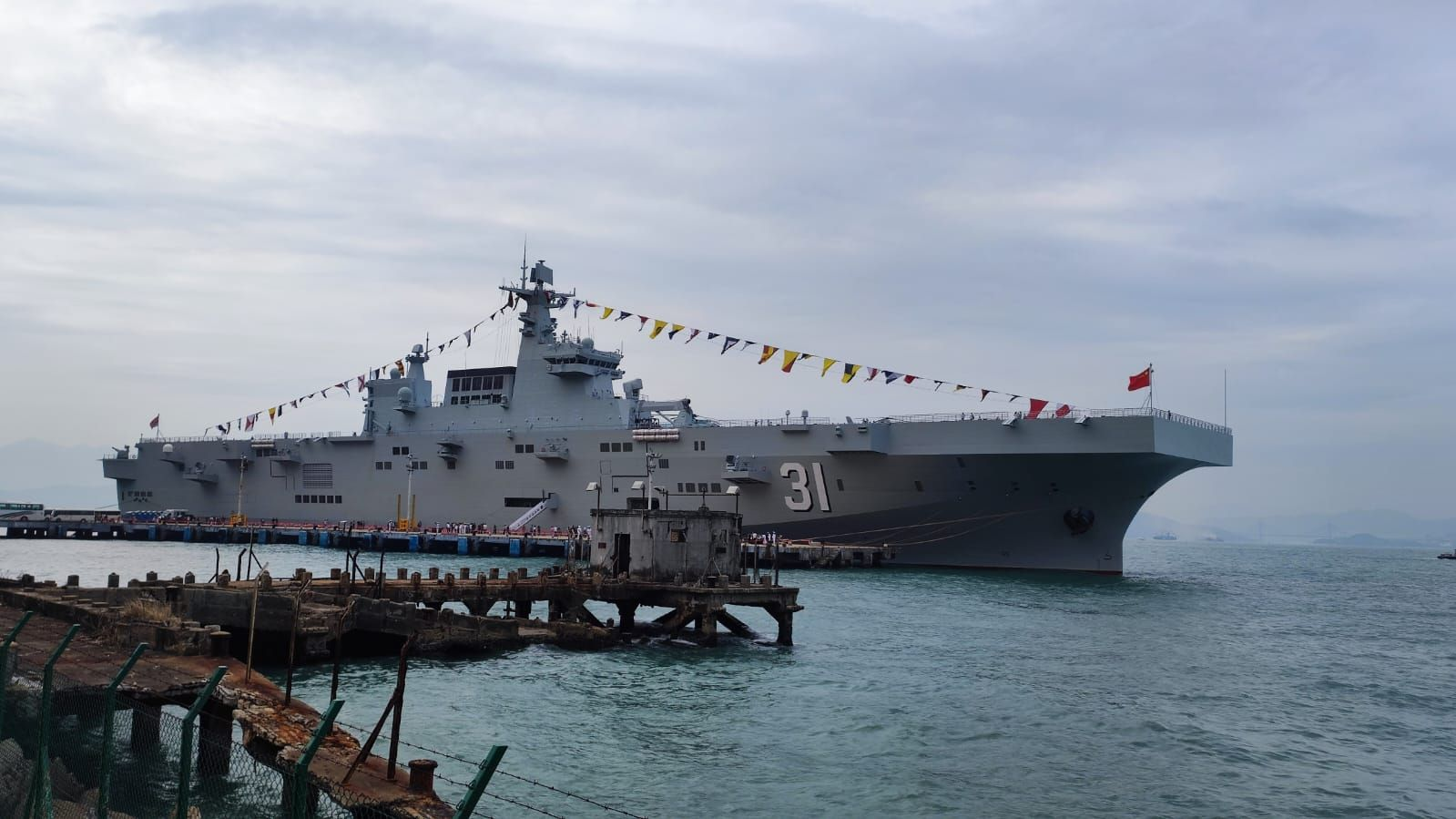
Hainan during its visit to Hong Kong

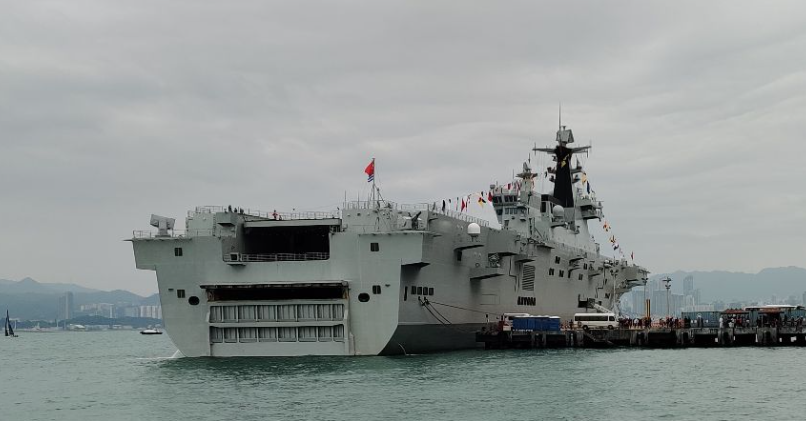
Rear of Hainan

== See also ==
- Chinese landing helicopter dock Guangxi
