= Landing helicopter dock =

Ship type

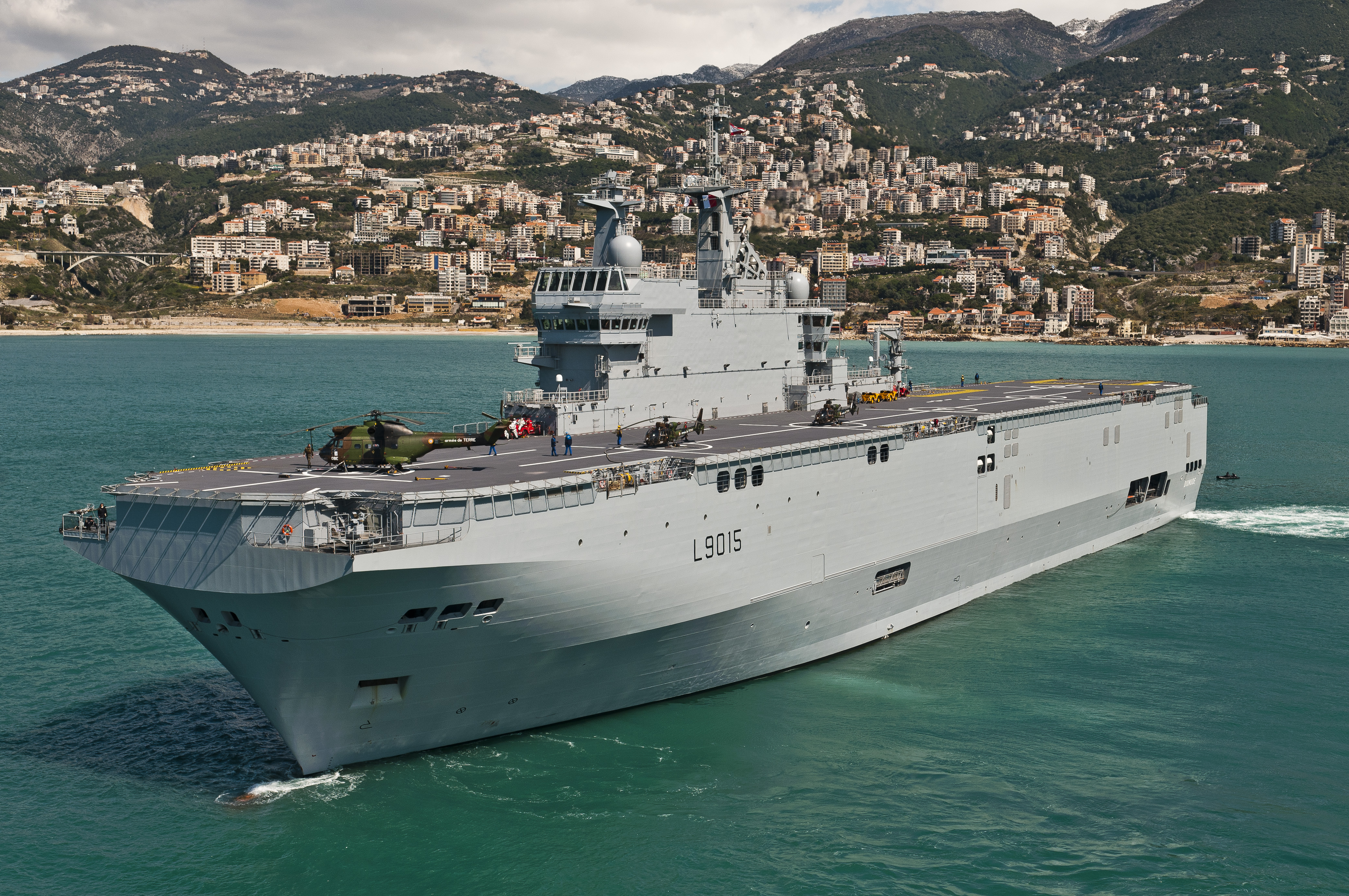
Dixmude in Jounieh Bay, Lebanon 2012

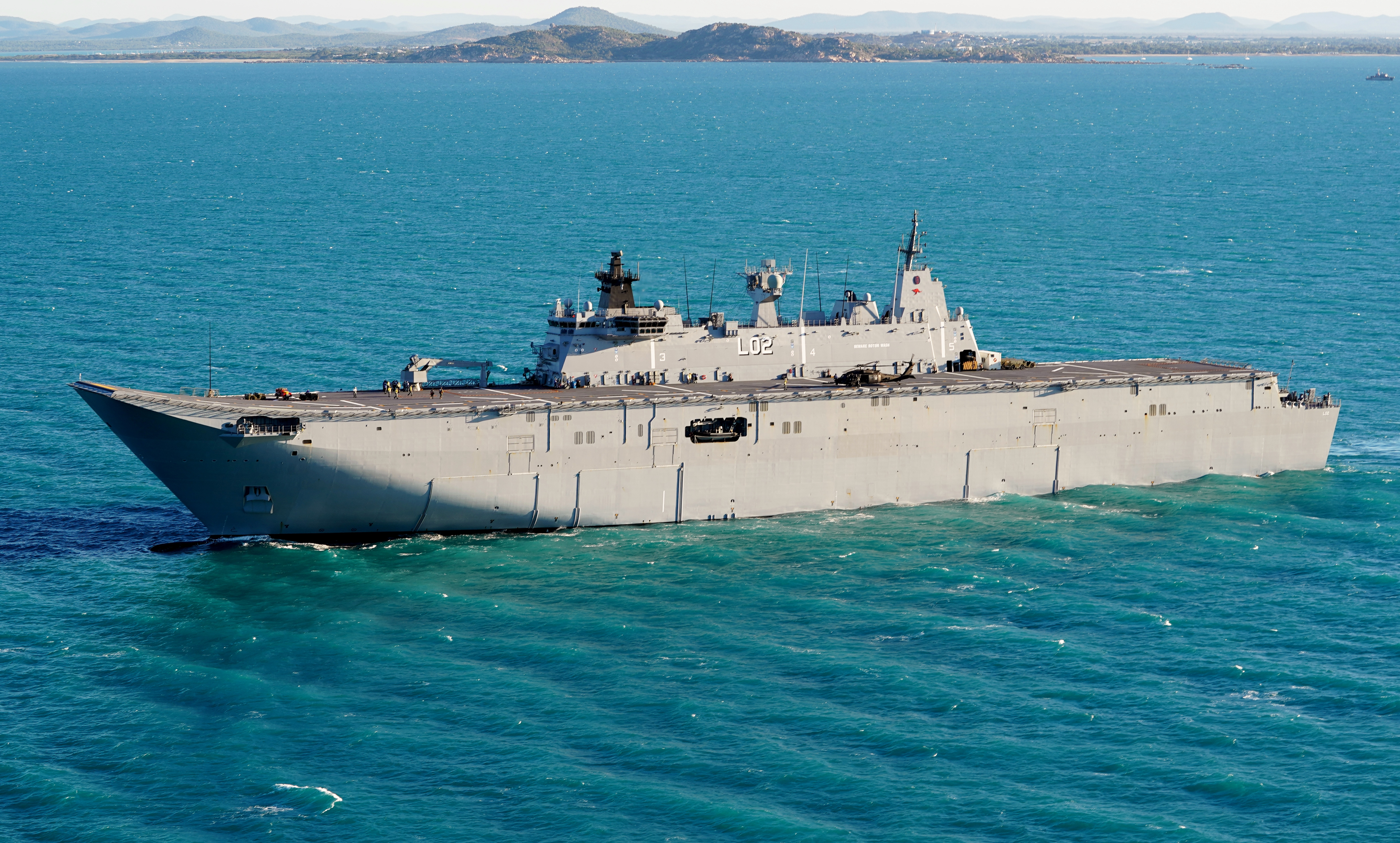
HMAS Canberra, a Canberra-class landing helicopter dock of the Royal Australian Navy

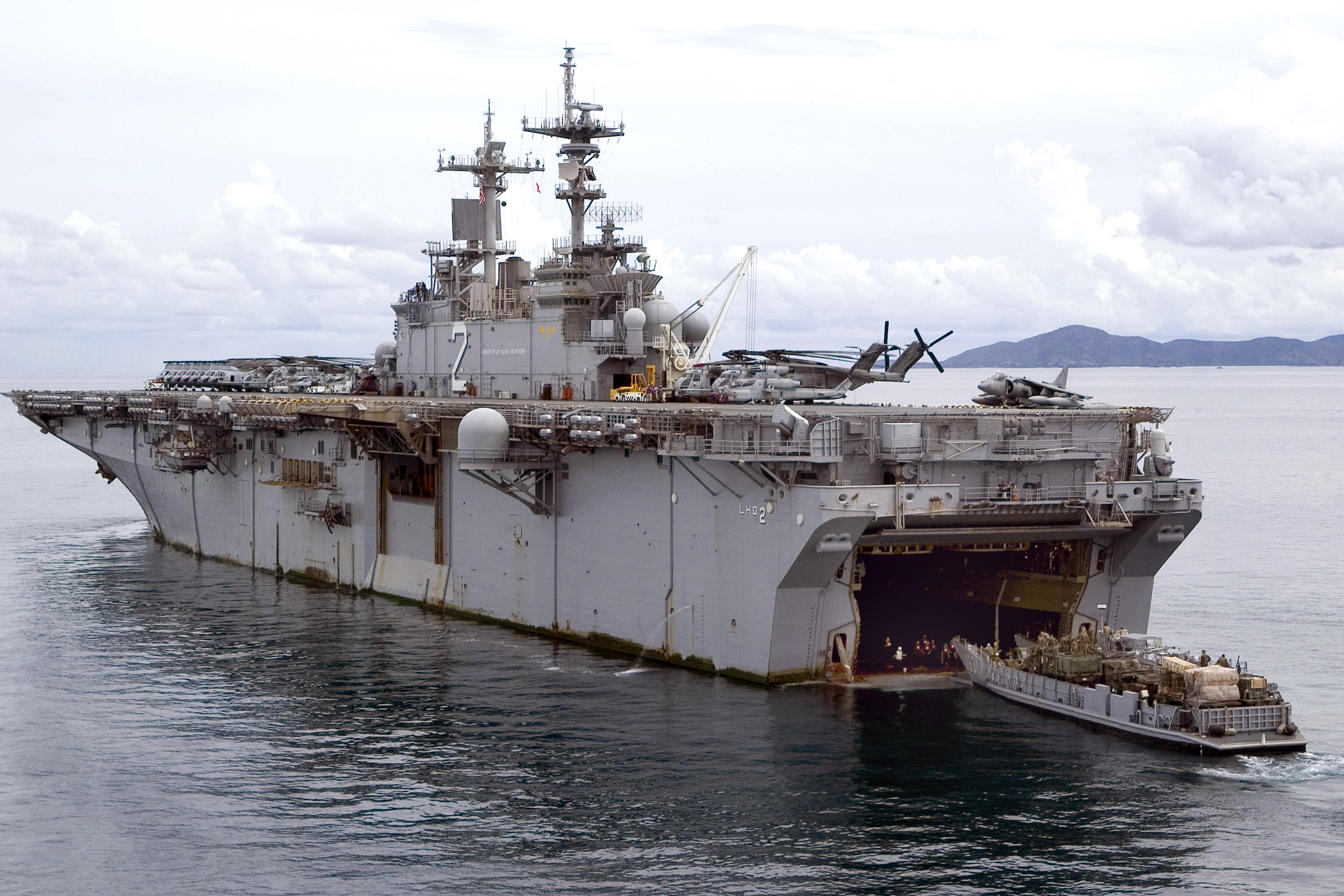
USS Essex performing a stern gate mating with a landing craft

A landing helicopter dock (LHD) is a multipurpose amphibious assault ship that is capable of operating both as a helicopter carrier and as a dock landing ship. LHD vessels are built with a full-length flight deck similar in appearance to a light aircraft carrier to operate VTOL rotorcrafts such as utility/attack helicopters, tiltrotor aircraft (such as the MV-22 Osprey) and VSTOL fixed-wing aircraft (such as the AV-8 Harrier and the F-35B Lightning II), as well as a well dock for launching landing crafts and amphibious vehicles. Some recent designs, such as the Chinese Type 076 class, even support CATOBAR operations for light aircraft and UCAVs via aircraft catapults and arresting gears.

The United States Navy (USN) and the Royal Australian Navy (RAN) use the term as a specific hull classification symbol. Examples of this kind of ship include the USN's Wasp class, French Navy's Mistral class and ships of the Spanish Navy's Juan Carlos I class including those designs based on the class, such as the RAN's Canberra class. Other nations also use the designation for their vessels, such as the Republic of Korea Navy for its Dokdo class. The Type 075 and Type 076 classes of the People's Liberation Army Navy (PLAN), though only regarded as amphibious assault ships in their native China, are considered LHDs in NATO reporting names.

The landing helicopter assault (LHA) is a similar USN hull classification with two classes that both precede and follow the ships classed LHD. Most LHAs also have well decks of a comparable size to LHDs, with the exception of the first two America-class ships (LHA-6 and LHA-7), which lack the well deck entirely to make room for larger hangars. However, LHA-8 will feature a well deck, returning the terms to their more interchangeable state.

== See also ==
- Landing platform helicopter
- Helicopter carrier
- Drone carrier
- List of amphibious warfare ships
- List of United States Navy amphibious warfare ships § Amphibious Assault Ship (Multi-Purpose) (LHD)
