= Type 075 landing helicopter dock =

Class of Chinese amphibious assault ships

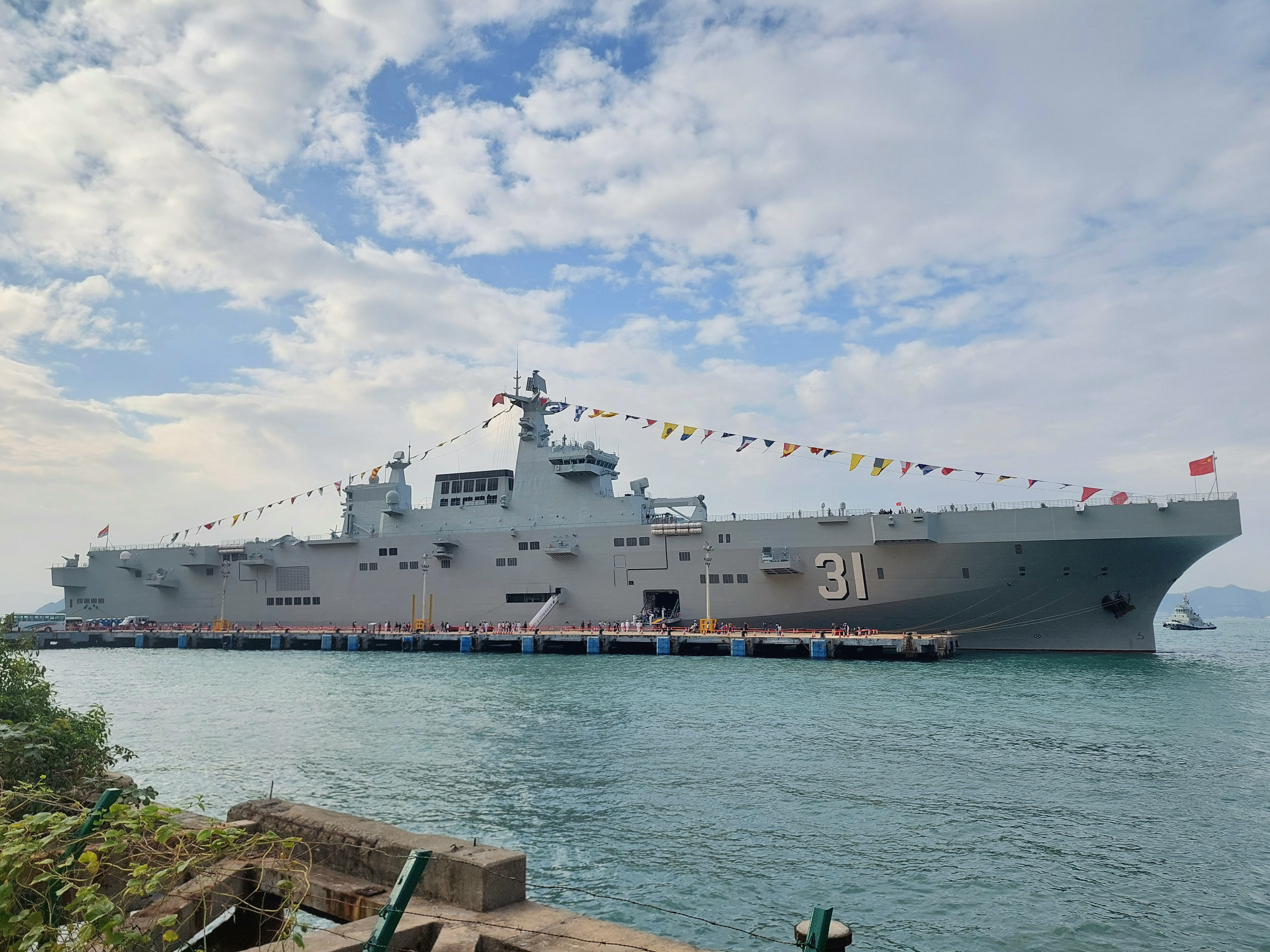
- The lead ship of the class, Hainan, in Hong Kong, 2024

Class overview
- Builders: Hudong–Zhonghua Shipbuilding
- Operators: People's Liberation Army Navy
- Preceded by: Type 071 amphibious transport dock
- Succeeded by: Type 076 landing helicopter dock
- Built: 2018–present
- In service: 2021–present
- Planned: 8
- Completed: 4
- Active: 4

General characteristics
- Type: Amphibious assault ship
- Displacement: 35,000 to 40,000 t (34,000 to 39,000 long tons)
- Length: 232 m (761 ft 2 in)
- Beam: 36.8 m (120 ft 9 in)
- Boats & landing craft carried: 3 × Type 726 Yuyi-class LCAC
- Capacity: 60 armoured fighting vehicle
- Troops: 800 troops
- Armament: 2 × H/PJ-14 30 mm (1.2 in) CIWS; 2 × HQ-10 SAM
- Aircraft carried: 28 helicopters: AR-2000; Harbin Z-20; Changhe Z-18; Changhe/Harbin Z-8; Changhe Z-10 (from the ground force)
- Aviation facilities: Hangar deck

The Type 075 landing helicopter dock (NATO reporting name: Yushen-class landing helicopter assault) is a class of Chinese amphibious assault ships built by Hudong–Zhonghua Shipbuilding for the People's Liberation Army Navy (PLAN). It has a full-length flight deck for helicopter operations and features a floodable well deck from which to disembark hovercraft and armored amphibious assault vehicles.

== History ==
In 2011, the Marine Design and Research Institute of China (708 Institute) of the China State Shipbuilding Corporation began design work. Debate over the desired result may have continued into 2016. Reportedly, the Central Military Commission Equipment Development Department favored a smaller design than the final Type 075, effectively an enlarged Type 071 amphibious transport dock, possibly due to concerns that the existing propulsion plant was insufficient for a larger ship. Ultimately, the PLAN's desire for an LHA prevailed. In 2018, Hudong–Zhonghua Shipbuilding received the contract and construction began that year.

In June 2019, images of Hainan appeared, the first ship under construction in drydock. In April 2020, she suffered a minor fire while fitting out which did not slow construction. In April 2021, Hainan was commissioned, and reached initial operating capability in March 2022.

In November 2022, the PLAN announced that the first two ships were combat-ready.

== Design ==
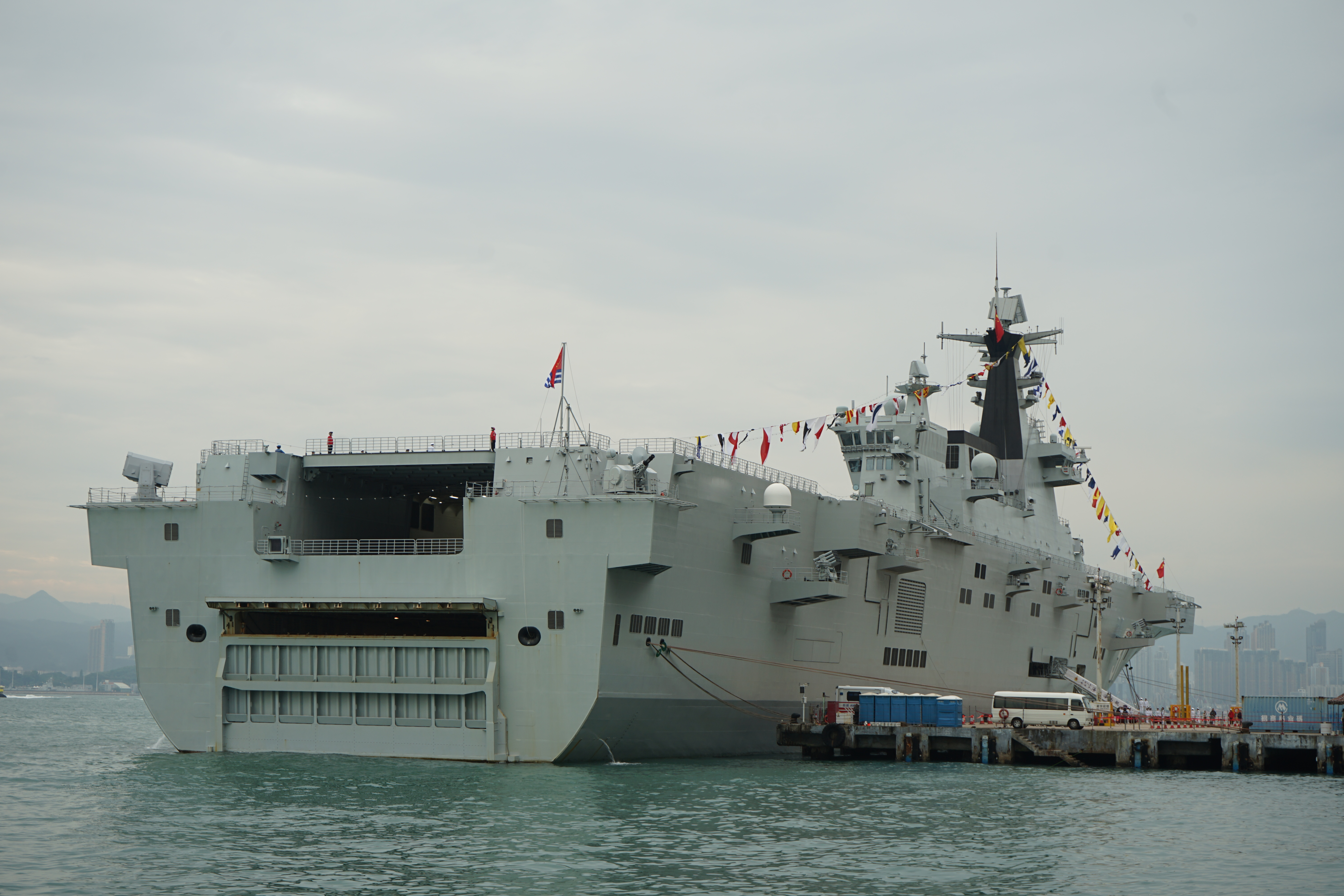
The well deck door of the Hainan (LHD-31)

The flight deck is 226 meters (741 ft 6 in) long and 36 m (118 ft 1 in) wide. There are seven flight spots - six along the port side and one aft of the island. The forward aircraft elevator can carry one medium helicopter with rotors folded; the stern elevator is larger and can carry Changhe Z-8 helicopters with rotors folded. The class can also launch a type of carrier-based unmanned helicopter, the AR-2000.

Two weapons elevators are located on the forward flight deck. The hangar may be 150 m (492 ft 2 in) long, 20 m (65 ft 7 in) wide, and 6 m (19 ft 8 in) high. The ship may operate 20 to 35 aircraft.

The well deck and vehicle deck are one continuous space. The well deck has a 20-meter (66 ft) wide gate and may be 80–90 m (262 ft 6 in – 295 ft 3 in) long, sufficient for two or three Type 726 LCACs. The vehicle deck is large enough for a PLAN Marine Corps amphibious mechanized infantry company plus additional platoon-sized tank or artillery elements. An opening on each side allows roll-on/roll-off access to the vehicle deck. The ship has an estimated displacement between 35,000 to 40,000 t (34,000 to 39,000 long tons), or more than 40,000 t (39,000 long tons) at full displacement.

The ship is fitted with H/LJQ-382 long-range 3D search radar, an active electronically scanned array (AESA) radar, an approach radar, and an electronic warfare sensor system. Self-defense is provided by the two HHQ-10 short-range air defense missile systems and two 11-barrel H/PJ-14 close-in weapon systems (CIWS), and anti-swimmer/antisabotage rocket launchers.

== Operational history ==
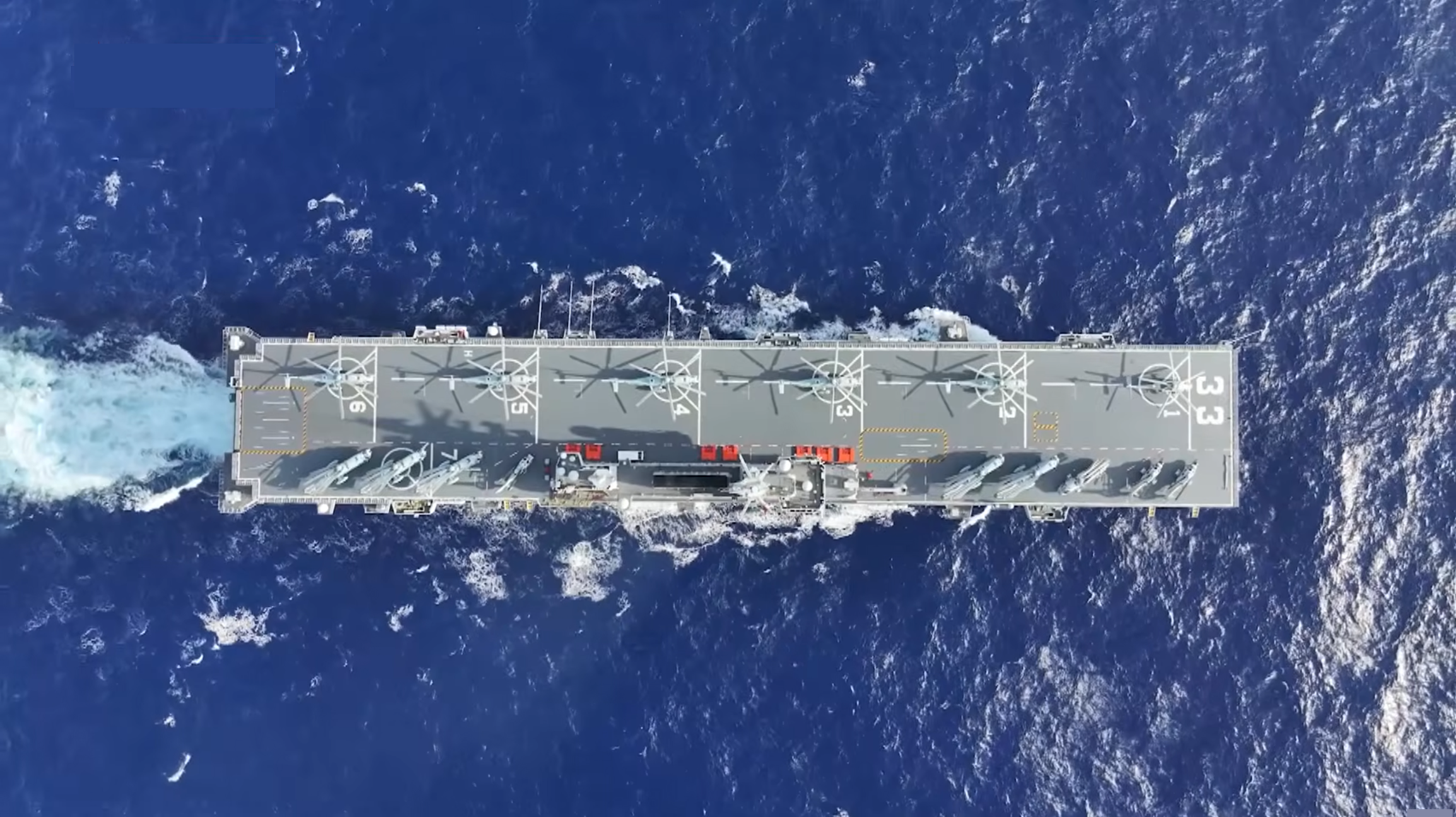
Flight deck of the Type 075

In December 2025, the Type 075 class was deployed in the Philippine Sea.

In late December 2025, the Type 075 was involved in the People's Liberation Army military exercise Justice Mission 2025 around Taiwan. The Type 075 was described in the PLA media as part of the deterrence and blockade force.

== List of ships ==
Pennant number	Name	Namesake	Builder	Launched	Commissioned	Fleet	Status
31	Hainan	Province of Hainan	Hudong-Zhonghua, Shanghai	25 September 2019	23 April 2021	South Sea Fleet	Active
32	Guangxi	Autonomous Region of Guangxi	Hudong-Zhonghua, Shanghai	22 April 2020	April 2022	East Sea Fleet	Active
33	Anhui	Province of Anhui	Hudong-Zhonghua, Shanghai	29 January 2021	1 October 2022	East Sea Fleet	Active
34	Hubei	Province of Hubei	Hudong-Zhonghua, Shanghai	14 December 2023	1 August 2025	South Sea Fleet	Active

== Gallery ==
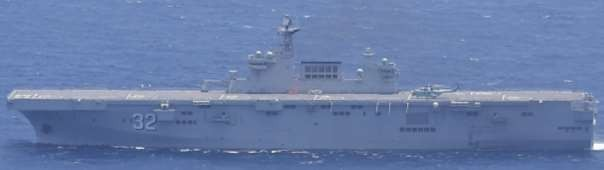
Guangxi sailing past Ōsumi Strait off Kagoshima prefecture in Japan, 2023

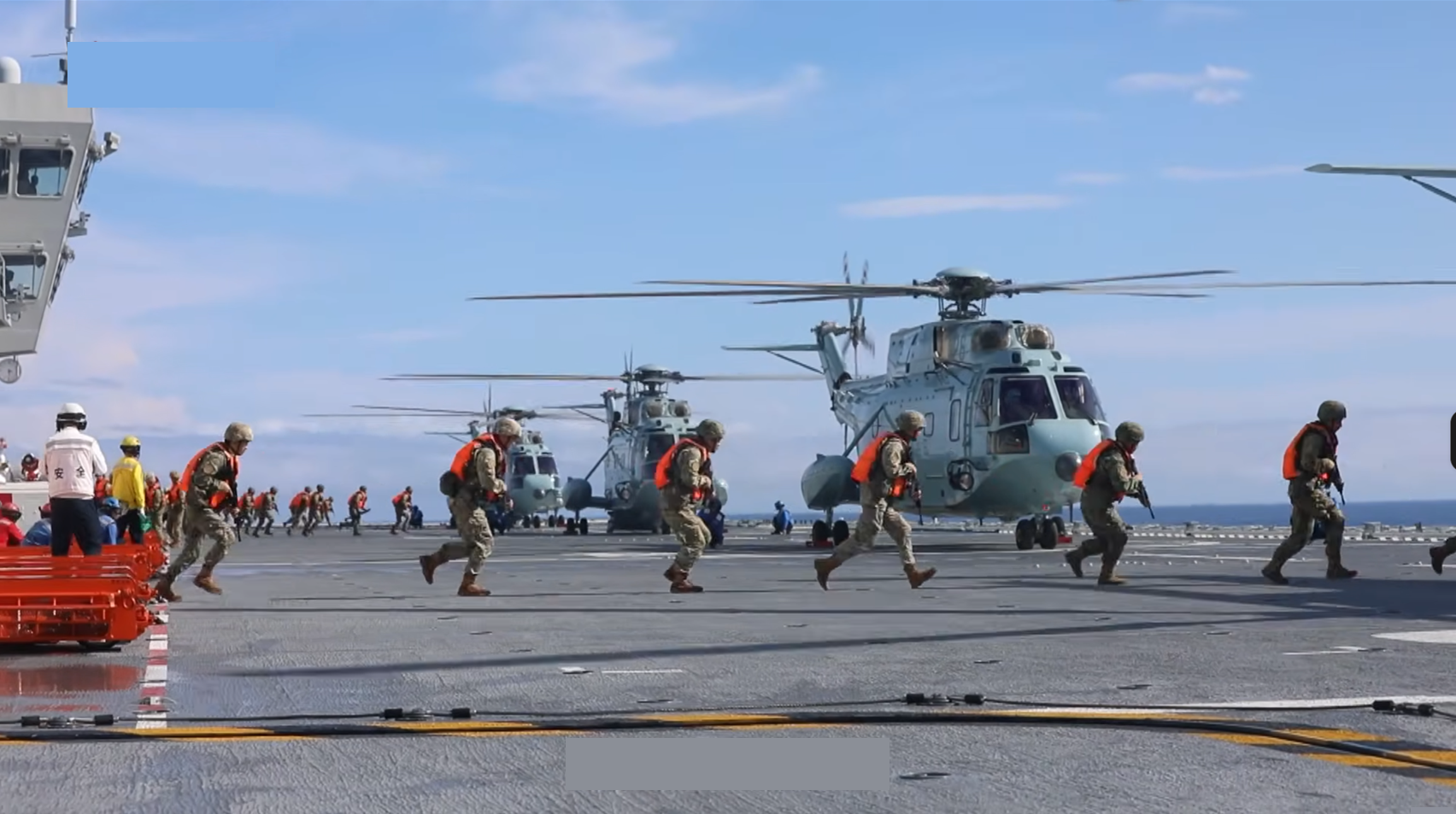
Chinese marines boarding helicopters on the flight deck of the Type 075 Anhui

== See also ==
- List of ships of the People's Liberation Army Navy
- List of aircraft carriers in service

Equivalent amphibious warfare ships of the same era

- America class
- Trieste class
- Canberra class
- Juan Carlos I class
- Project 23900
- Anadolu class

== Sources ==
- Kennedy, Conor M.; Caldwell, Daniel (October 2022). The Type 075 LHD: Development, Missions, and Capabilities (Report). CMSI China Maritime Reports. Vol. 23. United States Naval War College China Maritime Studies Institute.
