= French ship Dixmude (L9015) =

French amphibious assault ship

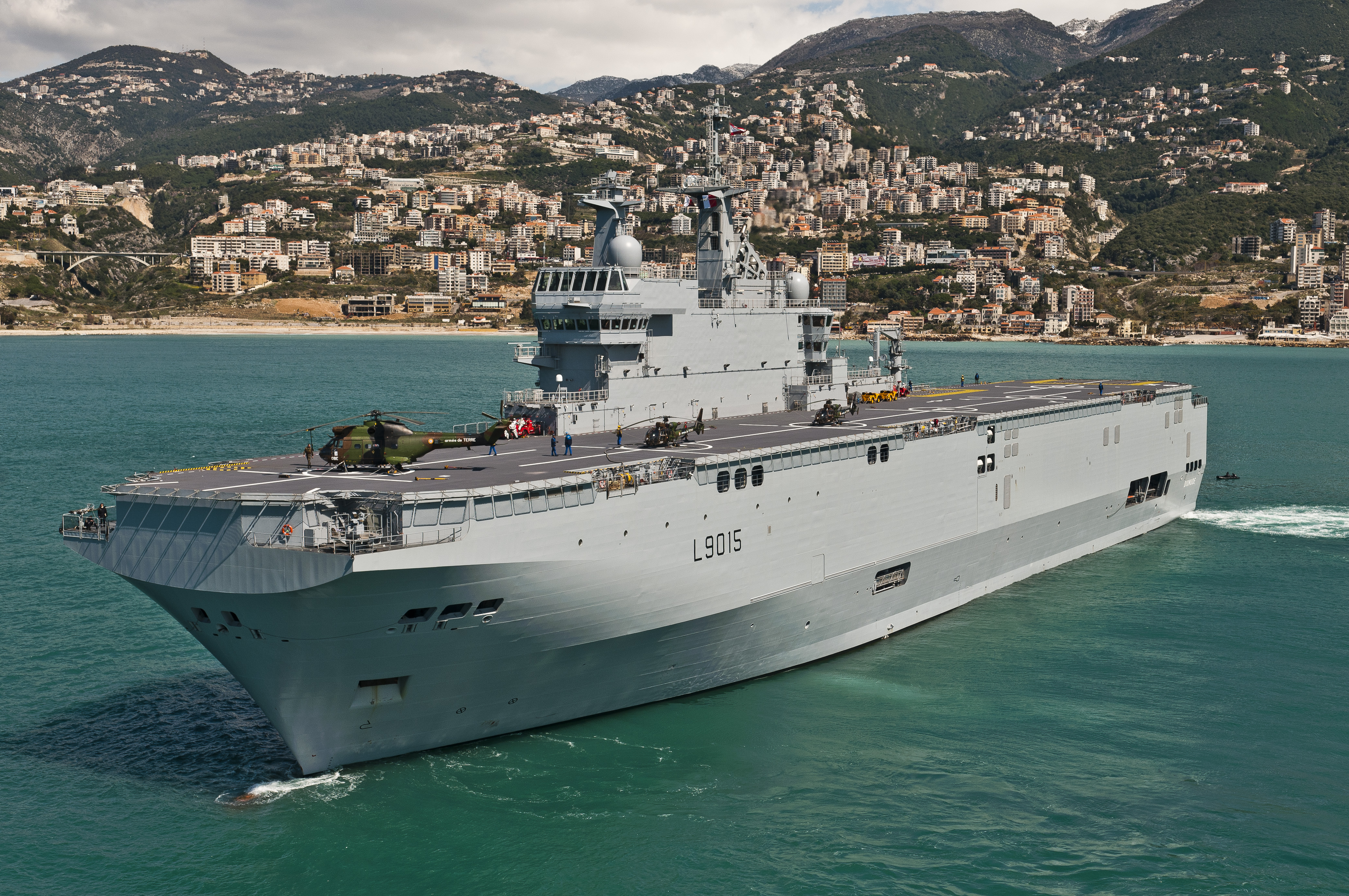
- BPC Dixmude in Jounieh bay, Lebanon 2012.

History

France
- Name: Dixmude
- Namesake: Fusiliers Marins at the battle of Diksmuide
- Builder: Chantiers de Saint-Nazaire
- Cost: €451.6m (FY 2012)
- Laid down: 20 January 2010 at Saint-Nazaire
- Launched: 17 September 2010
- Commissioned: 27 December 2012
- Home port: Toulon
- Identification: Pennant number: L9015; MMSI number: 228784000; Callsign: FADX; Deck Code: DX
- Status: in active service

General characteristics
- Class & type: Mistral-class amphibious assault ship
- Displacement: 16,500 t (empty); 21,300 t (full load); 32,300 t (with ballast)
- Length: 199 m (653 ft)
- Beam: 32 m (105 ft)
- Draught: 6.3 m (21 ft)
- Installed power: 4 × Wärtsilä 16V32 (4 × 6.2 MW (8,300 hp))
- Propulsion: Diesel-electric; two Rolls-Royce Mermaid azimuth thrusters (2 × 7 MW (9,400 hp)) with 5-bladed fixed pitch propellers
- Speed: 18.8 knots (34.8 km/h; 21.6 mph)
- Range: 5,800 nautical miles (10,800 km) at 18 knots (33 km/h; 21 mph); 10,700 nautical miles (19,800 km) at 15 knots (28 km/h; 17 mph)
- Capacity: 2 barges, one Leclerc battalion, 70 vehicles
- Complement: 20 officers; 80 petty officers; 60 quarter-masters; 450 passengers (900 for a short cruise); 150-man operational headquarter
- Armament: 2 × Simbad missile systems; 2 x 20 mm modèle F2 gun; 2 × 30 mm Breda-Mauser autocannons; 2 x 7.62 × 51 mm M134 miniguns; 4 × 12.7 mm M2-HB Browning machine guns
- Aircraft carried: 16 heavy or 35 light helicopters

Dixmude (L9015) is an amphibious assault ship, a type of helicopter carrier, of the French Navy. She is the third vessel to bear the name, and is the third ship of the Mistral class.

Dixmude was delivered to the French defence procurement agency on 3 January 2012, three months ahead of schedule.

== Service history ==
In January 2013, Dixmude took part in Operation Serval, ferrying elements of the 92^{ème} Régiment d'Infanterie to Mali.

In April 2016, it was announced she would be part of the Anglo-French military exercise CJEX.

In July 2018, the ship docked in Haifa port, Israel, for a joint exercise with the Israeli Navy.

In October 2018, a French NH90 helicopter crashed on takeoff when mooring lashing was left tied, and this damaged the flight deck. The crash occurred at night, leaving 4 injured and 1 required medical evacuation.

In April 2020, the ship operated as part of a joint British, French and Dutch naval task force in response to the COVID-19 pandemic, in overseas territories in the Caribbean. RFA Argus was also present as the UK's commitment to supporting British Overseas Territories, along with HMS Medway as the Caribbean guard ship.

In February 2023, Dixmude was tasked to initiate an around-the-world deployment accompanied by the frigate La Fayette. The deployment was to involve a series of exercises and port calls en route, including at several French overseas territories. For the deployment, Dixmude embarked one of the new EDA-S landing craft, along with one EDA-R and one CTM landing craft. The two vessels returned to Toulon in July.

In November 2023, Dixmude deployed to Arish, Sinai, Egypt; to serve as a floating hospital for Gazan relief in the Gaza war between Hamas and Israel in the Gaza Strip. Its helicopter pad also allows for aeromedievac. The ship's 40 sick bay beds represent some 10% of available hospital beds in northern Sinai at the border with Gaza, in late 2023. By late January 2024, about 1000 patients had been treated aboard the warship turned field hospital-hospital ship.

In October 2024, Dixmude was deployed to the Lebanon coast in preparation to evacuate Western citizens from the intense Israeli bombardment and invasion of Lebanon in the Hezbollah-Israel front of the Gaza war.
