= Green-water navy =

Naval force capable of operating in both littoral waters and open oceans

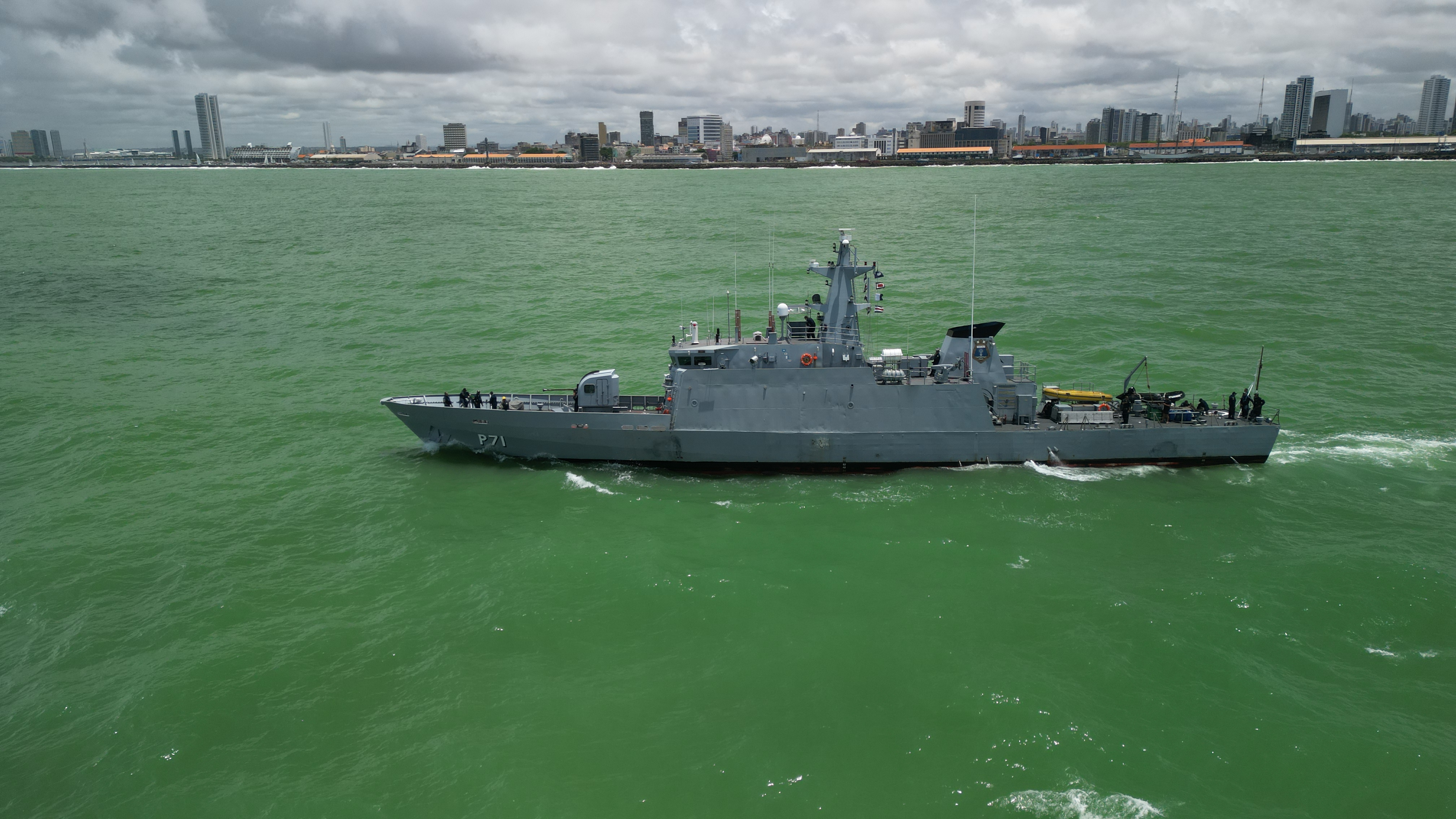
A Brazilian Navy Macaé-class patrol vessel off the coast

A green-water navy is a maritime force that is capable of operating in its state's littoral zones and has limited competency to operate in the surrounding marginal seas. It is a relatively new term, and has been created to better distinguish, and add nuance, between two long-standing descriptors: blue-water navy (deep waters of open oceans) and brown-water navy (inland waters, littoral and shallow seas).

As a non-doctrinal term with no concrete legal or political definition, it can be used in several different ways. It originated with the United States Navy, who use it to refer to the portion of their fleet that specializes in offensive operations in coastal waters. Nowadays such ships rely on stealth or speed to avoid destruction by shore batteries or land-based aircraft.

== Definitions ==
The elements of maritime geography are loosely defined and their meanings have changed throughout history. The US's 2010 Naval Operations Concept defines blue water as "the open ocean", green water as "coastal waters, ports and harbors", and brown water as "navigable rivers and their estuaries". Robert Rubel of the US Naval War College includes bays in his definition of brown water, and in the past US military commentators have extended brown water out to 100 nautical miles (190 km) from shore.

During the Cold War, green water denoted those areas of ocean in which naval forces might encounter land-based aircraft. The development of long-range bombers with anti-ship missiles turned most of the oceans to "green" and the term all but disappeared. After the Cold War, US amphibious task forces were sometimes referred to as the green-water navy, in contrast to the blue-water carrier battle groups. This distinction disappeared as increasing threats in coastal waters forced the amphibious ships further offshore, delivering assaults by helicopter and tiltrotor from over the horizon. This prompted the development of ships designed to operate in such waters – the Zumwalt-class destroyer and the littoral combat ships; modeling has suggested that current NATO frigates are vulnerable to swarms of 4-8 small boats in green water. Rubel has proposed redefining green water as those areas of ocean which are too dangerous for high-value units, requiring offensive power to be dispersed into smaller vessels such as submarines that can use stealth and other characteristics to survive. Under his scheme, brown water would be zones in which ocean-going units could not operate at all, including rivers, minefields, straits, and other choke points.

As the preeminent blue-water navy of the early 21st century, the US Navy is able to define maritime geography in terms of offensive action in the home waters of its enemies, without being constrained by logistics. This is not true for most other navies, whose supply chains and air cover typically limit them to power projection within a few hundred kilometers of home territory. A number of countries are working on overcoming these constraints. Other authors have started to apply the term "green-water navy" to any national navy that has ocean-going ships but lacks the logistical support needed for a blue-water navy. It is often not clear what they mean, as the term is used without consistency or precision.

A green-water navy does not mean that the individual ships of the fleet are unable to function away from the coast or in open ocean: instead, it suggests that due to logistical reasons they are unable to be deployed for lengthy periods and must have aid from other countries to sustain long term deployments. Also, the term "green-water navy" is subjective as numerous countries that do not have a true green-water navy maintain naval forces that are on par with countries that are recognized as having green-water navies. For example, the German Navy has near the same capability as the Canadian Navy but is not recognized as a true green-water navy. Another example is the Portuguese Navy that, despite being usually classified as a minor navy, has several times conducted sustained operations in faraway regions typical of the green-water navies. However, the differences between blue-water navies and brown or green-water navies are usually quite noticeable, for example, the US Navy was able to quickly respond to the disappearance of Malaysia Airlines Flight 370 and continue operations in the region with relative ease even though the search area covered the Indian Ocean. In contrast, in 2005 the then green-water Russian Navy was unable to properly respond when its AS-28 rescue vehicle became tangled in undersea cables unable to surface, relying on the blue-water Royal Navy to respond and carry out the rescue in time.

Just as states build up naval capability, some lose it. For example, the Austro-Hungarian Navy was a modern green water navy of the time, but as the countries lost their coasts during World War I, their navies were confiscated, and their ports became parts of Italy and Yugoslavia. The Axis powers lost naval capabilities after their defeat in World War II, with most of Japan's Imperial Navy and Germany's Navy being disarmed and their troop and ship numbers capped and monitored by the Allies. The collapse of the USSR also brought with it the collapse of the second-largest naval force in the world, and the largest submarine force in the world. Although the Russian Federation made sure to inherit the most capable ships, passing most older models to successor states, as it had lost the logistical capabilities of the Soviet Navy, it was no longer able to operate away from Russian shores for extended periods of time. Moreover, budget cuts forced large cuts in the submarine force, such as the retirements of the Typhoon-class submarine. As the Soviet Navy was built largely around submarine warfare the losses in the submarine capability have adversely affected the capability of the newly formed Russian Navy as well.

== Examples ==
=== Australia ===
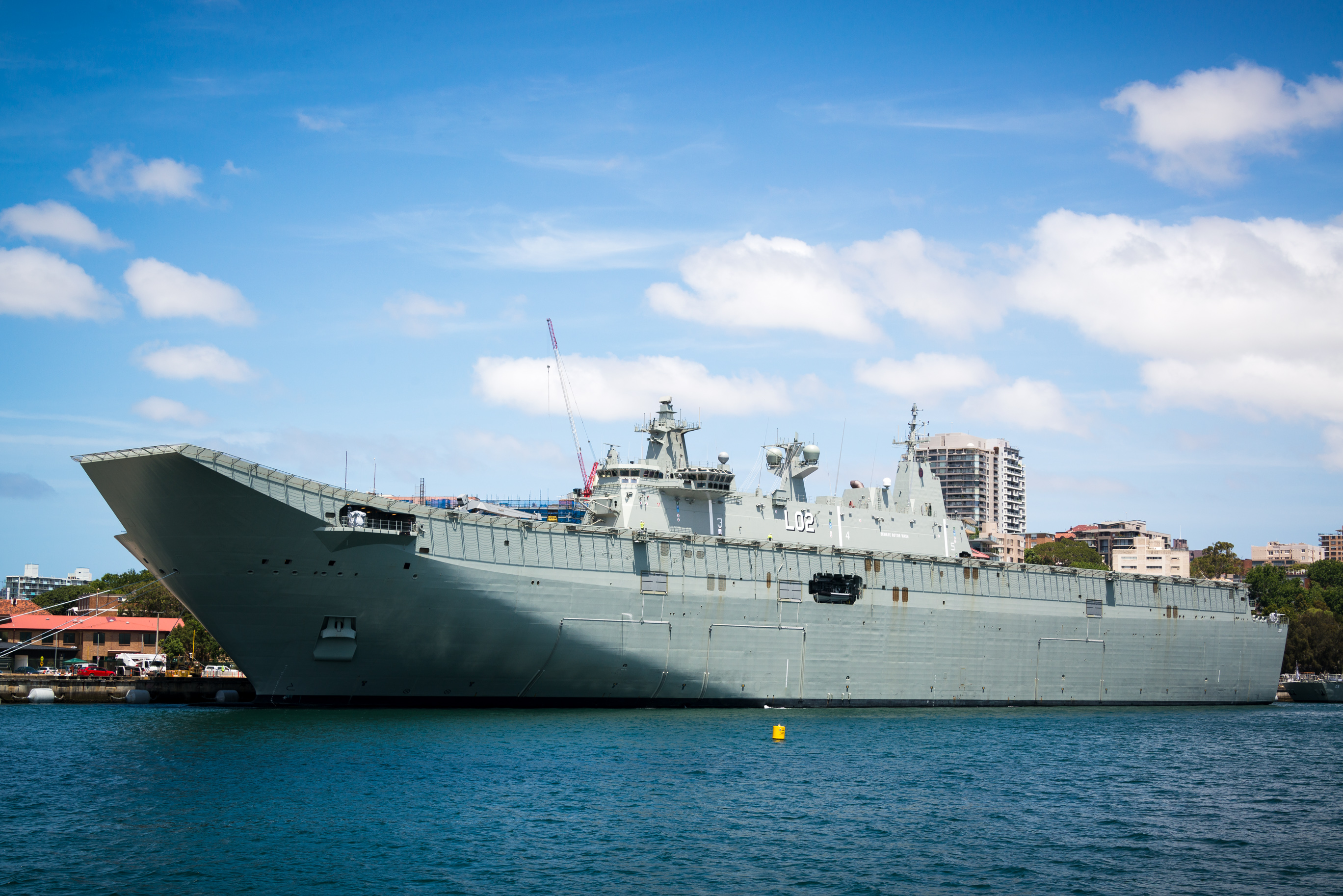
HMAS Canberra

The Royal Australian Navy is well established as a green-water navy. The navy sustains a broad range of maritime operations, from the Middle East to the Pacific Ocean, often as part of international or allied coalitions. The RAN operates a modern fleet, consisting of destroyers, frigates, conventional submarines as well as an emerging amphibious and power projection capability based on the commissioning of HMAS Choules and two Canberra-class landing helicopter docks:

- Carrier / amphibious capability – 27,000 tonne HMAS Canberra and HMAS Adelaide
- Amphibious capability – 16,190 tonne HMAS Choules.
- Replenishment capability – 19,500 tonne HMAS Supply and HMAS Stalwart

=== Brazil ===
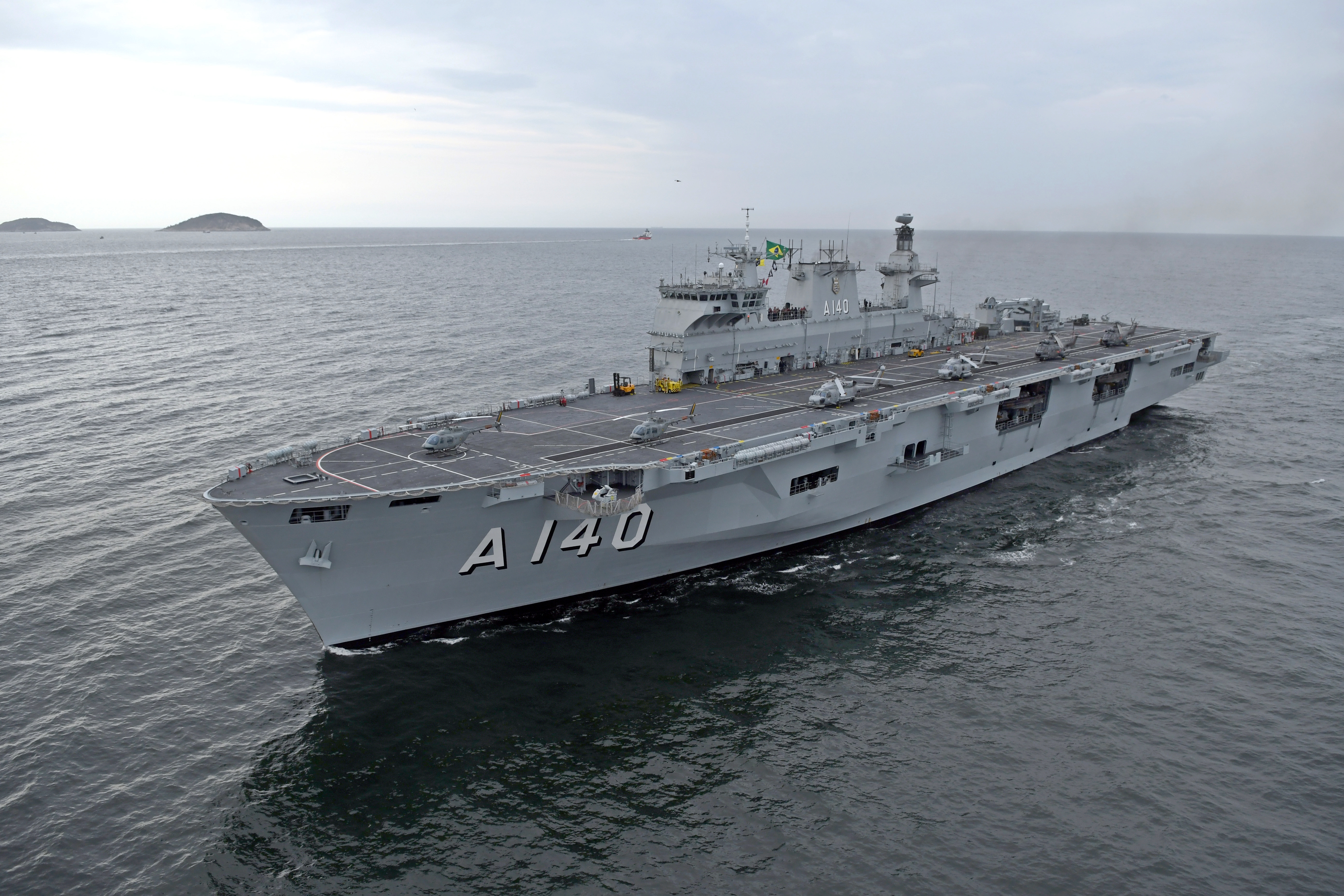
The Brazilian aircraft carrier Atlântico

The Brazilian Navy has frequently been dubbed a "green-water" force by experts. The navy is primarily focused on securing the country's littorals and exclusive economic zone (EEZ), but also maintains the capacity to operate in the wider South Atlantic Ocean. Since the early 2000s, the Brazilian Navy has contributed to a number of peacekeeping and humanitarian missions:

- Helicopter carrier and amphibious capability – 21,000 tonne Atlântico.
- Amphibious capability – 12,000 tonne Bahia, 8,757 tonne Newport-class tank landing ship, two 8,571 tonne Round Table-class landing ship logistics
- Replenishment capability – 10,000 tone Almirante Gastão Motta.

=== Canada ===
HMCS Halifax

According to the criteria as outlined in the 2001 publication, "Leadmark: The Navy's Strategy for 2020", the Royal Canadian Navy had met its description of a third tier "Medium Global Force Projection Navy" – a green-water navy with the capacity to project force worldwide with the aid of more powerful maritime allies (e.g. United Kingdom, France and the United States). In this context, the Royal Canadian Navy ranked itself alongside the navies of Australia and the Netherlands:

- Replenishing capability: MV Asterix, a dual civilian-military crewed replenishing oiler. This is an interim vessel which will provide at-sea replenishment until two new AORs (Protecteur-class auxiliary vessels) are completed around 2027-2029.

=== China ===
From the 1990s to the 2000s, the United States Navy also used the term to describe the early phase of the People's Liberation Army Navy's expansion towards a full blue-water navy. The concept was later applied by other authors to describe national navies that are able to project power in nearby regions but lack the ability to sustain long range operations without external support. Such navies typically operate amphibious ships, and in some cases, small aircraft carriers, escorted by destroyers and frigates with limited logistical backing from tankers and auxiliary vessels.

Some analysts have argued that China long occupied an intermediate position between a green-water navy and a blue-water navy. However, developments in the 2020s, including operations such as the 2025 Chinese naval exercises in the Tasman Sea, have been cited as evidence that China is now able to conduct sustained operations far from its home waters consistent with the capabilities of a blue-water navy.

=== Japan ===
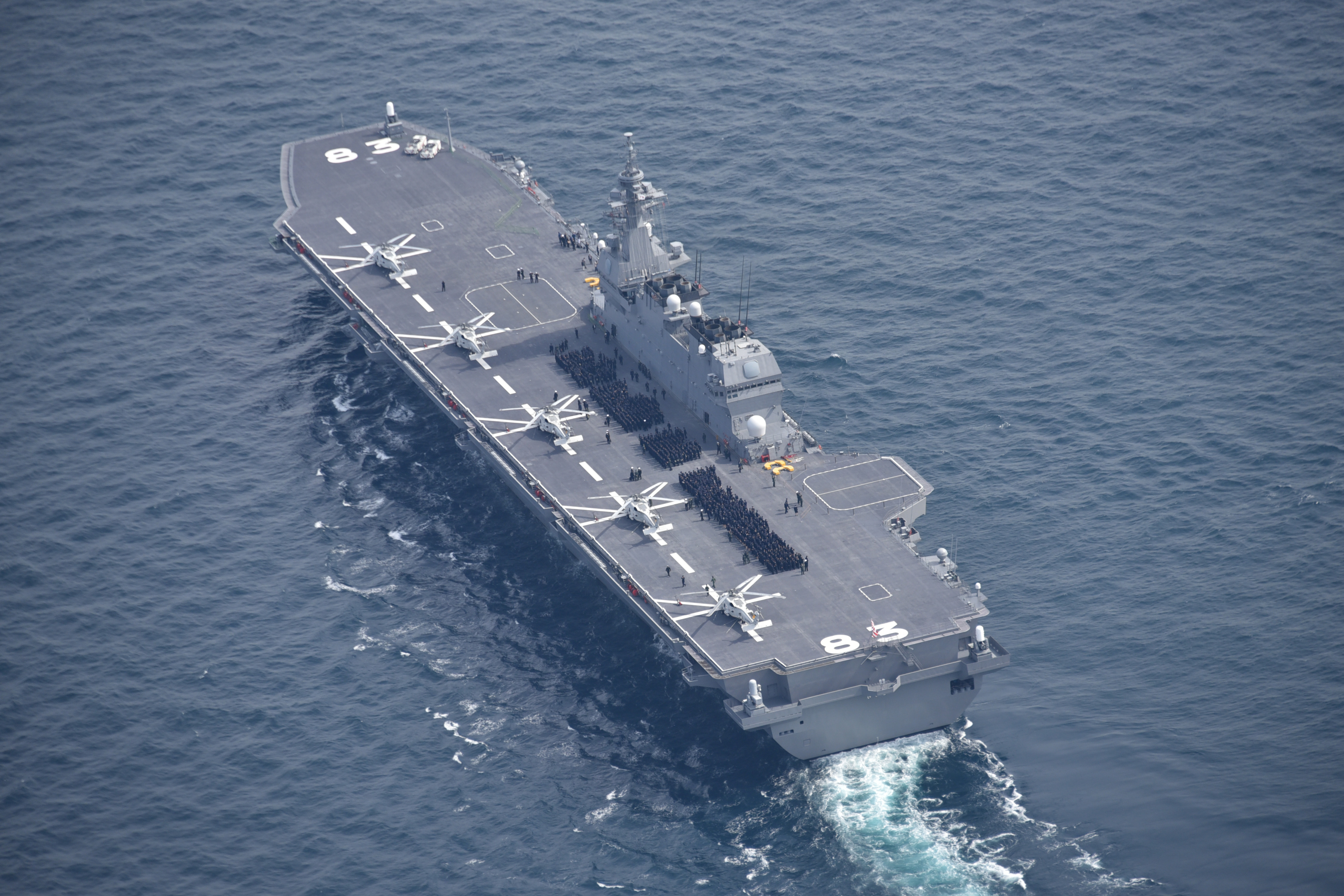
JS Izumo

The Japan Maritime Self-Defense Force is considered to be a green-water navy. Overseas JMSDF deployments include participation in the Combined Task Force 150, and an additional task force in the Indian Ocean from 2009 to combat piracy in Somalia. The first postwar overseas naval air facility of Japan was established next to Djibouti-Ambouli International Airport:

- Helicopter carrier capability – two 19,000 tonne Hyūga-class helicopter destroyers and two 27,430 tonnes Izumo-class helicopter destroyers though these have been modified to carry fixed wing aircraft.
- Amphibious capability – three 14,000 tonne Ōsumi-class tank landing ships.
- Replenishment capability – two 25,000 tonne Mashu class and three 15,000 tonne Towada class.

=== Netherlands ===
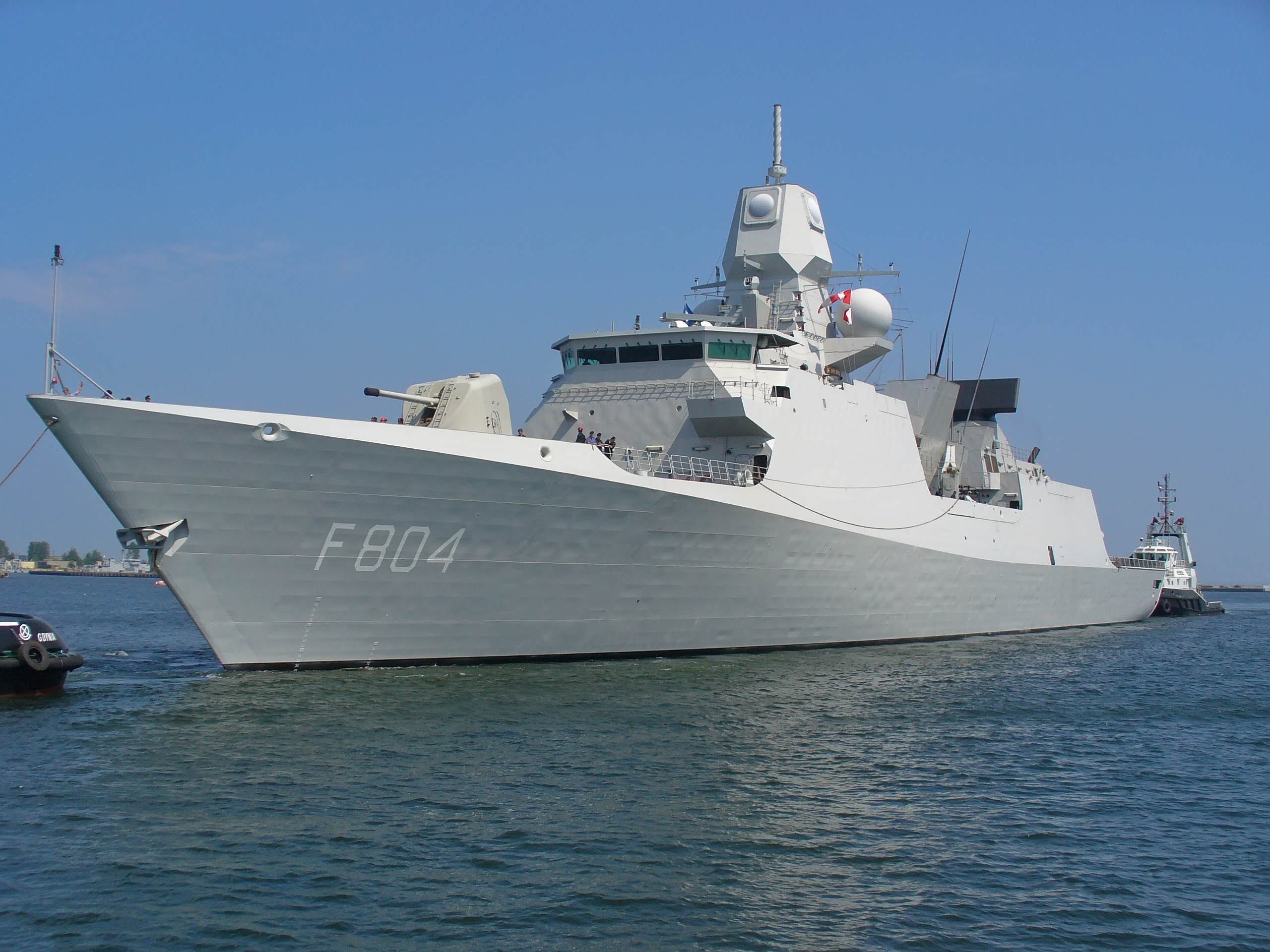
HNLMS De Ruyter (F804), a De Zeven Provinciën-class frigate

The Royal Netherlands Navy has been officially described as a 3rd tier "Medium Global Force Projection Navy" – or a green-water navy with the capacity to project force worldwide with the aid of more powerful maritime allies (e.g. Britain, France and the United States). In this context, the Royal Netherlands Navy ranks alongside the navies of Australia and Canada, while the USN is a 1st tier global blue-water navy and Britain and France are 2nd tier blue-water navies. For many years since the end of the Cold War, the Royal Netherlands Navy has been changing its role from national defence to overseas intervention:

- Amphibious capability – 12,750 tonne HNLMS Rotterdam and the 16,800 tonne HNLMS Johan de Witt.
- Replenishment capability – 27,800 tonne Karel Doorman (Also has amphibious capabilities), plus combat support ship Den Helder (building; projected service entry 2024).

=== Spain ===
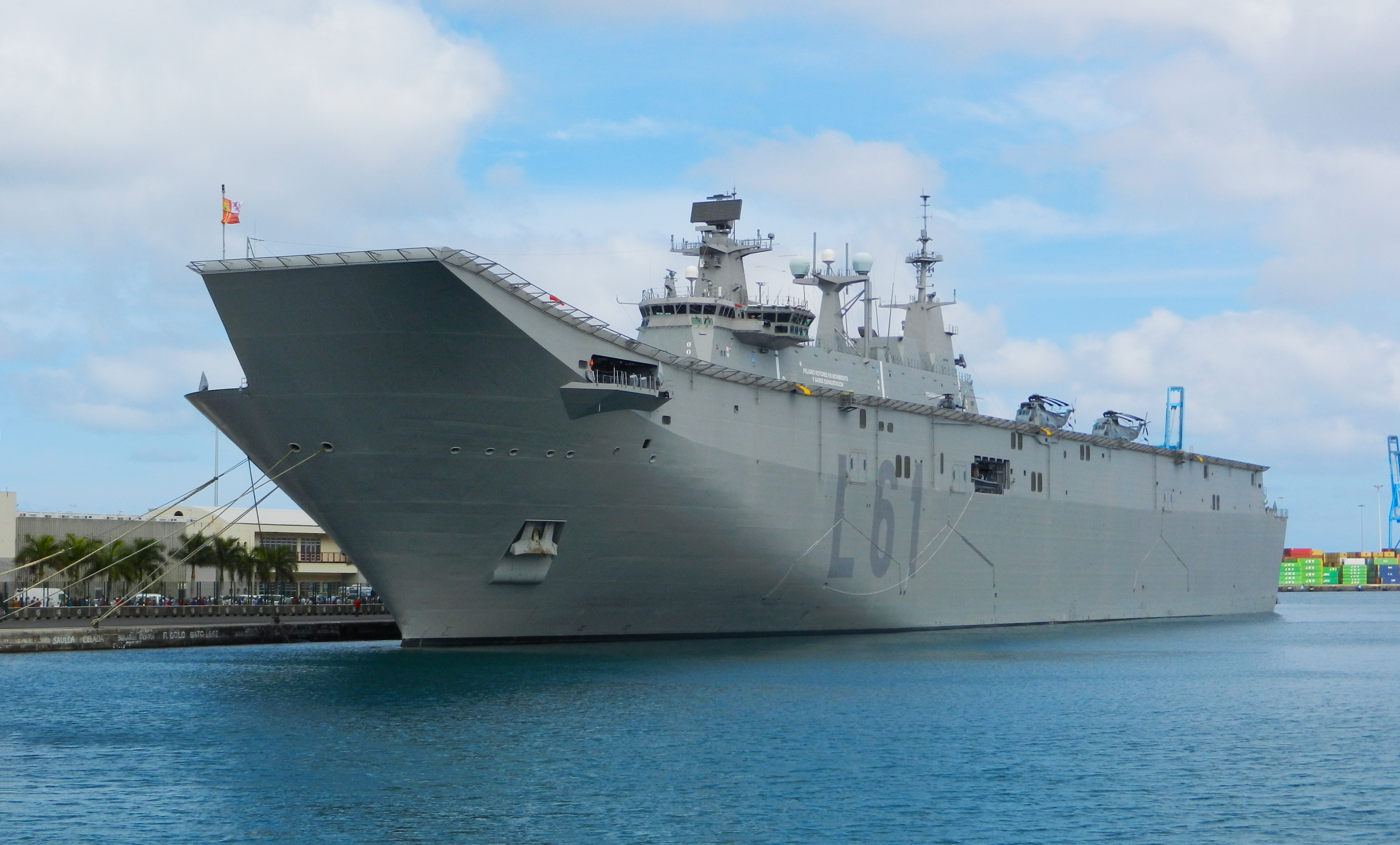
Juan Carlos I

The Spanish Navy is a green-water navy, and participates in joint operations with NATO and European allies around the world. The fleet has 54 commissioned ships, including; one amphibious assault ship (also used as an aircraft carrier), two amphibious transport docks, 5 AEGIS destroyers (5 more under construction), 6 frigates, 7 corvettes (2 more under construction) and three conventional submarines. (4 under construction)

- Amphibious/carrier capability – 26,000 tonne Juan Carlos I.
- Amphibious capability – two 13,815 tonne Galicia-class landing platform docks.
- Replenishment capability – 17,045 tonne Patiño and the 19,500 tonne Cantabria replenishment ships.

=== South Korea ===
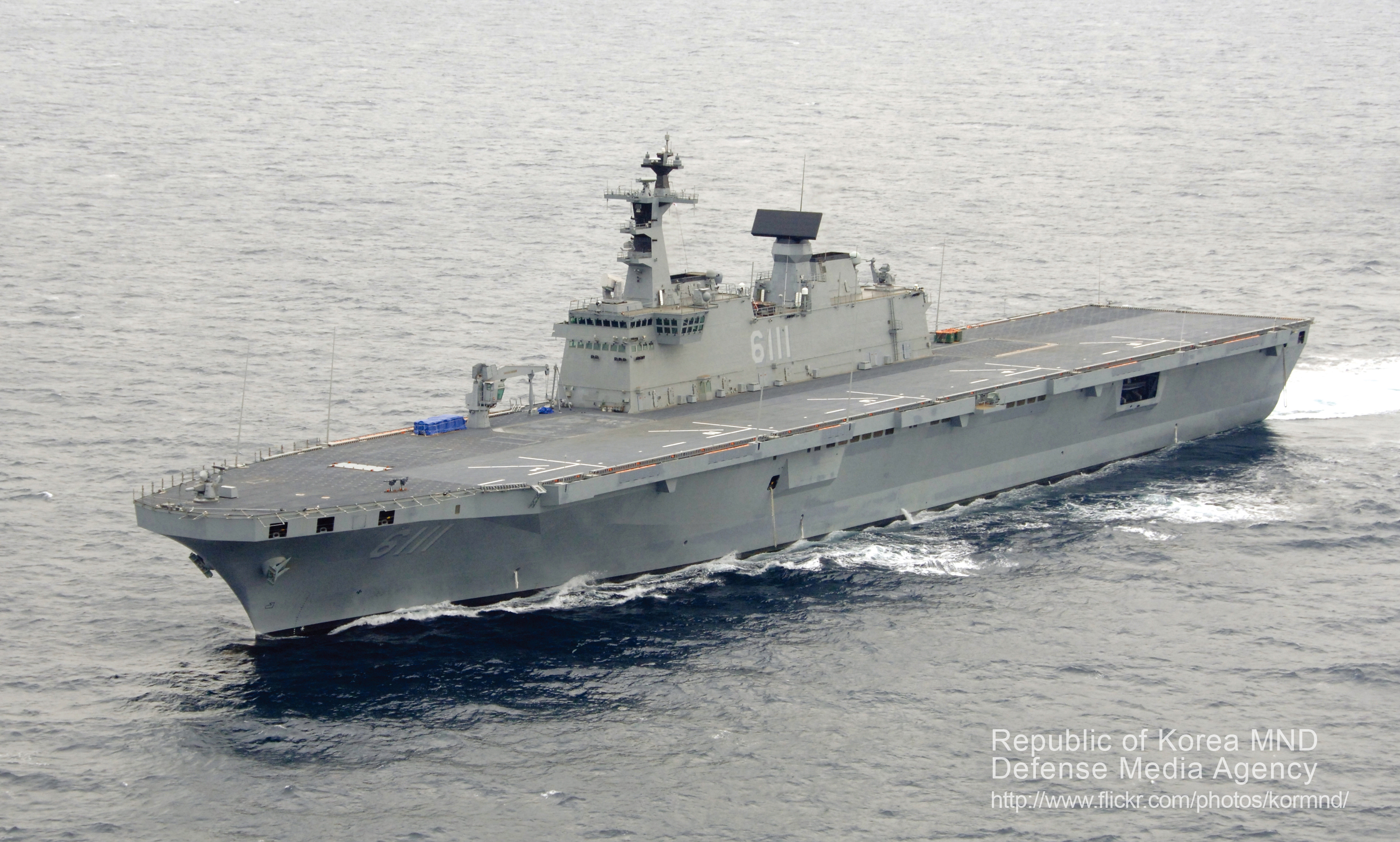
ROKS Dokdo

The Republic of Korea Navy is considered to be a green-water navy. In 2011, the government authorized the building of a naval base on Jeju Island to support the new Dokdo-class amphibious assault ships, the base will also be capable of supporting joint forces with the US Navy. A ski-jump for the operation of V/STOL jet fighters is being considered for the second ship of the Dokdo class. The Korean government is considering to buy surplus Harriers as a possible interim for the F-35 Lightning II if they choose to operate VTOL aircraft at all. On December 3, 2021, the National Assembly passed the budget to fund a fixed-wing aircraft carrier tentatively named CVX-class aircraft carrier capable of operating F35B, expected to enter operations possibly as early as 2033 LinkLinkLink South Korea participates in the Combined Task Force 151 with the expeditionary force Cheonghae Unit:

- Helicopter carrier capability – two 18,800 tonne Dokdo-class amphibious assault ships
- Amphibious capability – four 7,300 tonne Cheon Wang Bong-class LSTs, and four 4,300 tonne Go Jun Bong-class LSTs
- Replenishment capability – one 23,000 tonne Soyang-class replenishment ship, and three 9,180 tonne Cheonji-class replenishment ships

=== Turkey ===
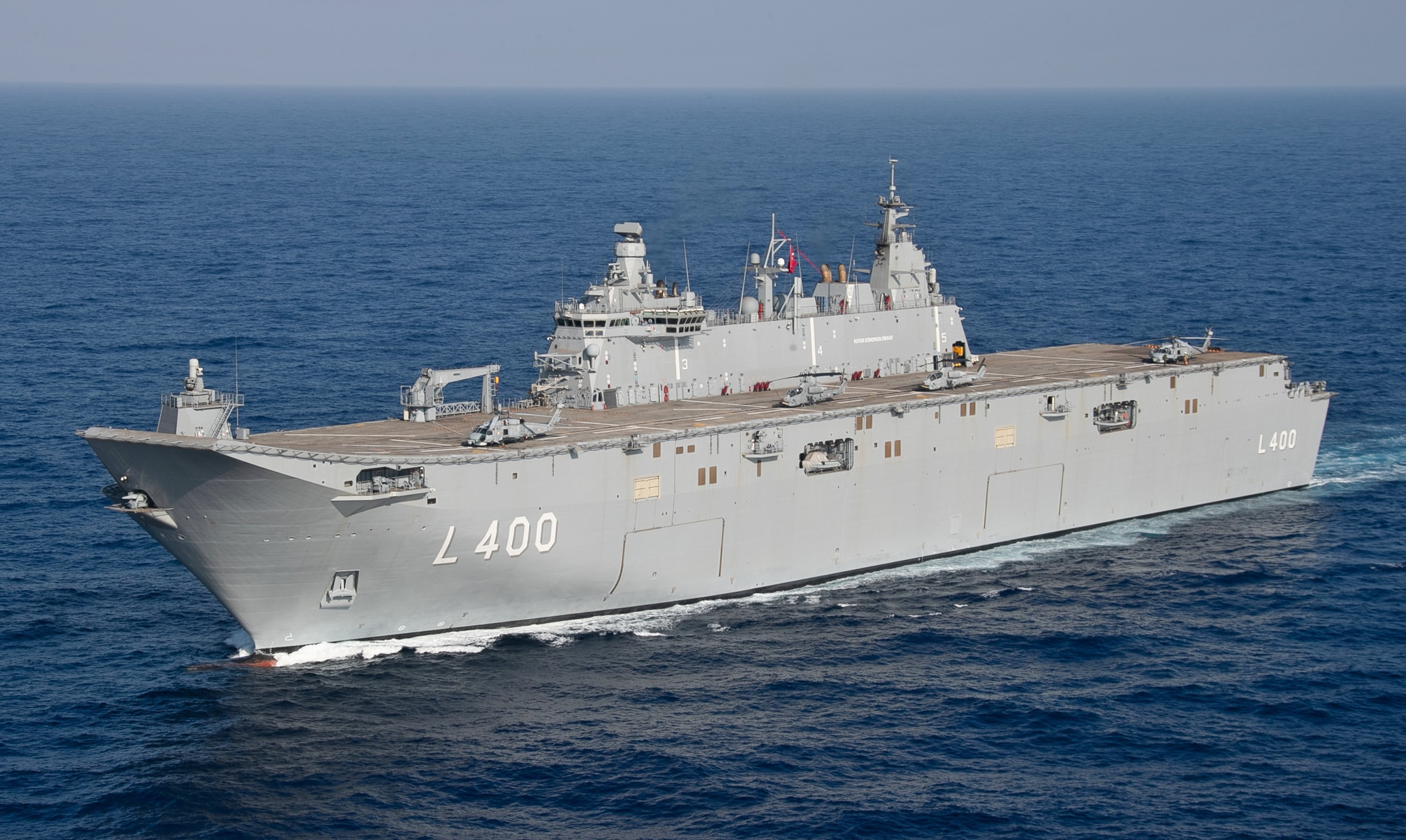
TCG Anadolu

According to a report by Haifa University, Turkey's naval might has become a significant source of concern for the Middle East and the Balkans, as they have greatly modernized its maritime force in recent years. The study puts the Turkish Naval Forces as the strongest in the region (Middle East), and describes the Turkish navy as being a "green-water navy". According to Israeli Colonel Shlomo Guetta, one of the report's authors, Turkey is building a Navy that characterises a regional power and can conduct long-range operations. Guetta also highlighted the Turkish Navy's strike force and intervention capacity. A flagship project is the construction of TCG Anadolu, a drone-carrying amphibious assault ship that can serve as a light aircraft carrier. Quoting US military expert Richard Parley's estimates, the report argued that the new warship will offer Turkey unprecedented strike capabilities in the Black Sea and Eastern Mediterranean. The Turkish Navy, as of 2021, has a total of 156 naval assets, but Turkey plans to add a total of 24 new ships, which include four frigates, before the Republic reaches the 100th anniversary of its founding in 2023:

- Amphibious/carrier capability – 24,660 tonne TCG Anadolu.
- Amphibious capability – four 7,370 tonne Bayraktar-class tank landing ship, and the 3,773 tonne TCG Osman Gazi.
- Replenishment capability – two 19,350 tonne Akar-class replenishment oiler.

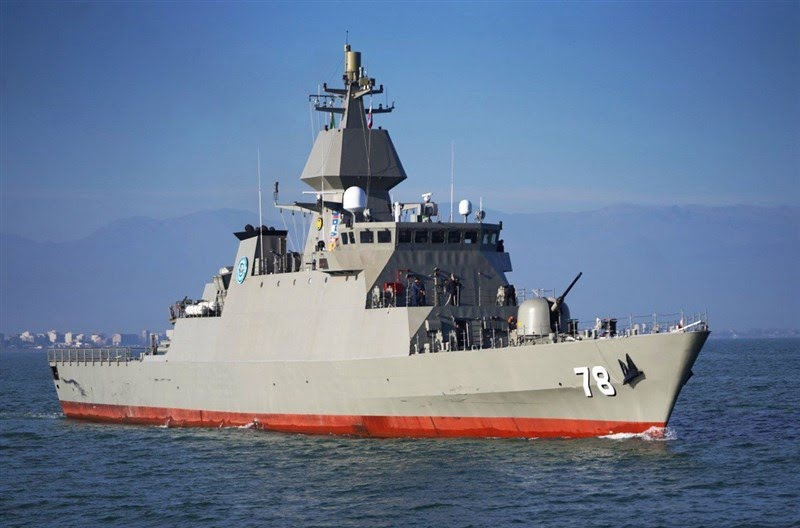
an

== See also ==
- Blue-water navy
- Brown-water navy
- Maritime geography
