= Landing platform helicopter =

Hull classification used by a number of the world's navies

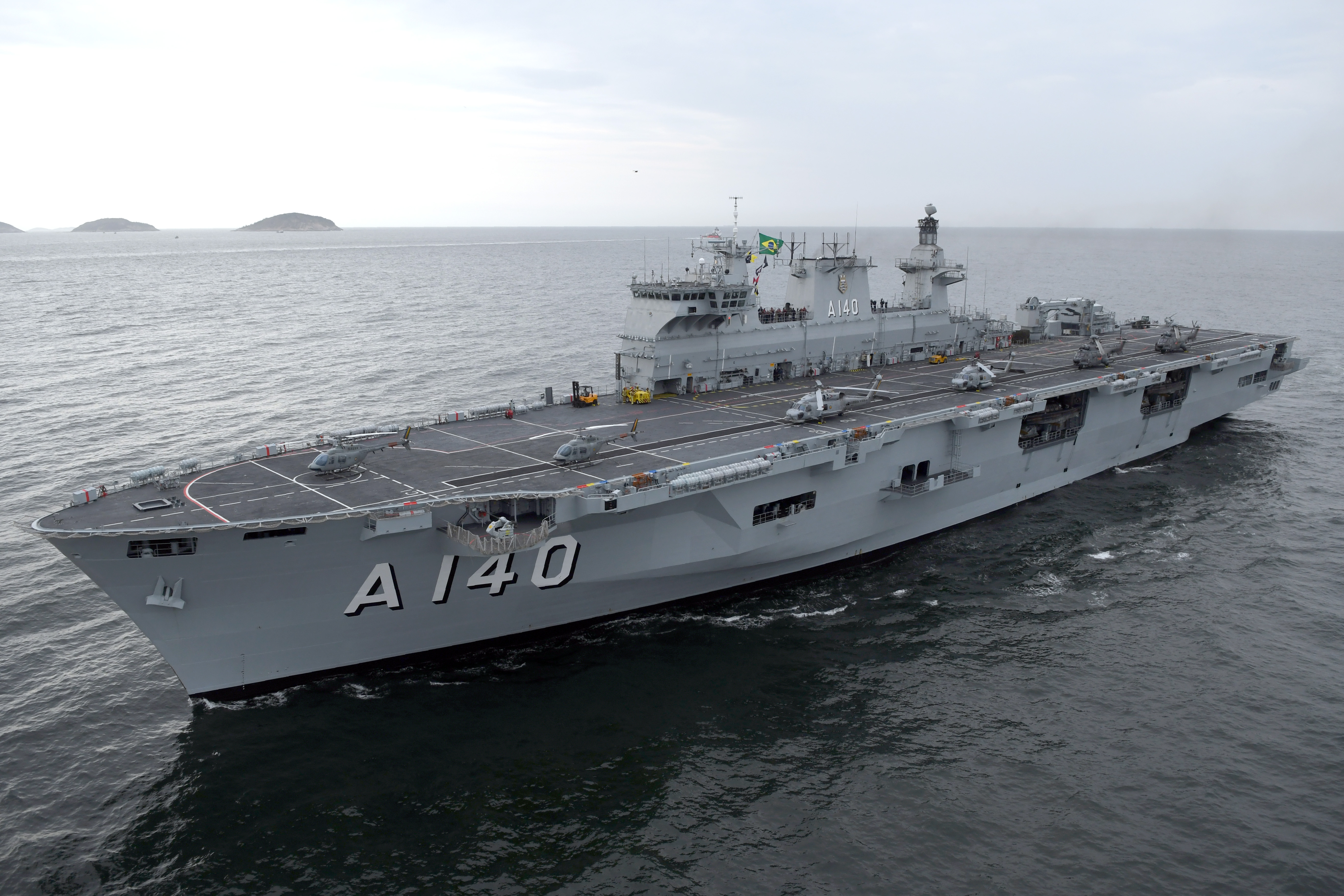
NAM Atlântico

Landing platform helicopter (LPH) is a term used by some navies to denote a type of amphibious warfare ship designed primarily to operate as a launch and recovery platform for helicopters and other VTOL aircraft. As such, they are considered a type of helicopter carrier.

Under the NATO Standardization Agreement (STANAG) document for reporting vessels, LPH is a short form designator used for "Amphibious Assault Ship, Helicopter" defined as a "large helicopter carrier" for carrying and deploying around 1,800 assault troops using its own aircraft, but for which use of landing craft is "not a principal function". For ships of this hull classification in the Royal Navy, LPH is a direct acronym for "Landing Platform Helicopter", while the United States Navy referred to its vessels within this classification as "Landing ship, Personnel, Helicopter", and after 2006 as "amphibious assault ships". The etymology is L for amphibious, P for transport, and H for helicopter. Regardless of the terminology, all vessels classified as an LPH possess essentially similar capabilities.

The Royal Navy also used the term "Commando Carrier", which it applied to aircraft carriers converted to helicopter only operations. Prior to selling the vessel to the Brazilian Navy in 2018, the RN operated HMS Ocean as an LPH. Following the British government's decision to withdraw its Harrier aircraft at the end of 2010, the former light fleet carrier HMS Illustrious also performed this role until decommissioning in 2014.

The LPH classification was used by the U.S. Navy for the amphibious assault ships of the Iwo Jima class, a converted Casablanca-class escort carrier and three converted Essex-class aircraft carriers. No ships of this classification are currently in active service with the U.S. Navy, having been replaced with multi-purpose ships classified under NATO naming conventions as landing helicopter dock or landing helicopter assault ships.

== Ships classified as LPH ==
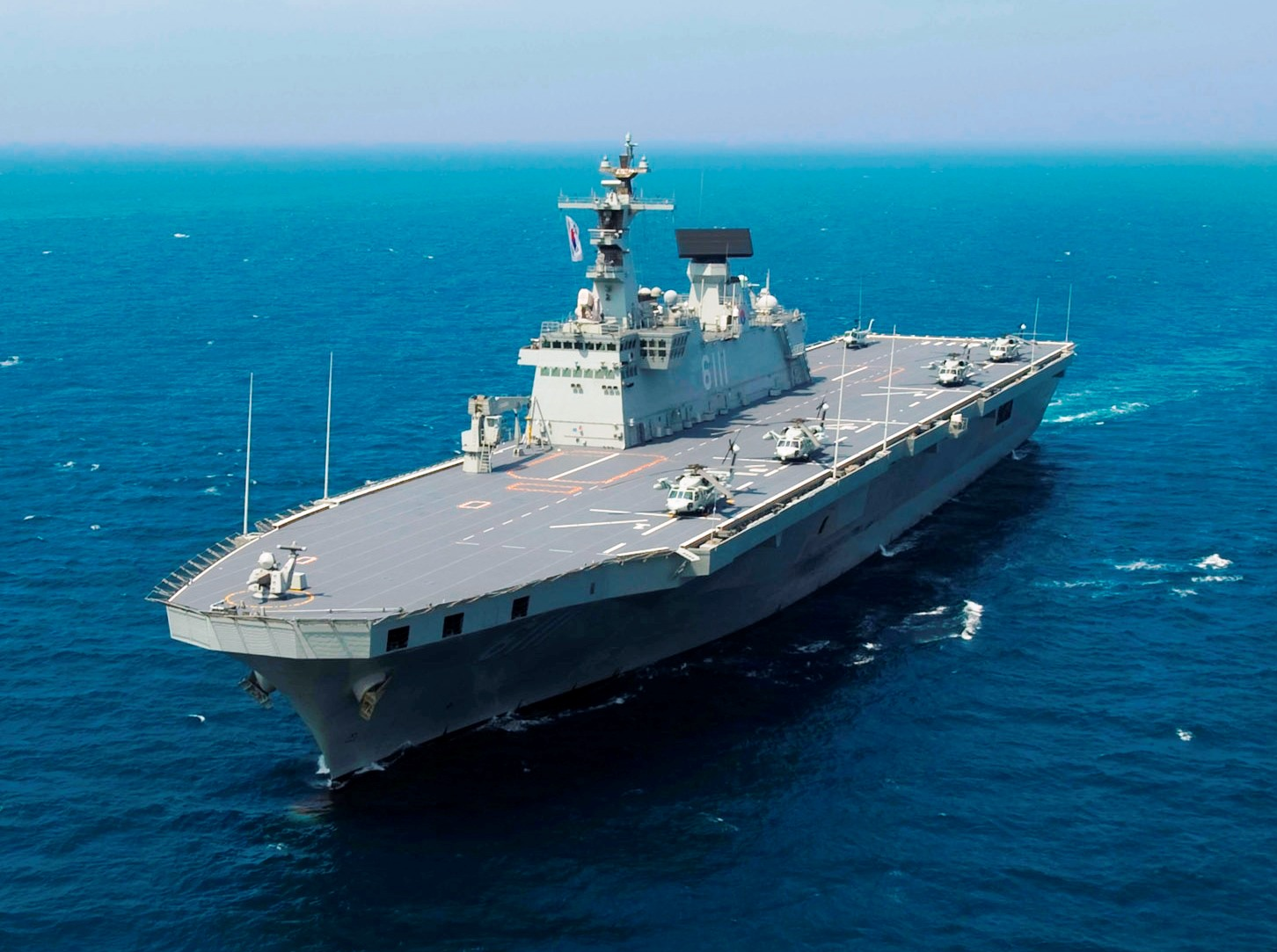
ROKS Dokdo, a current South Korean LPH

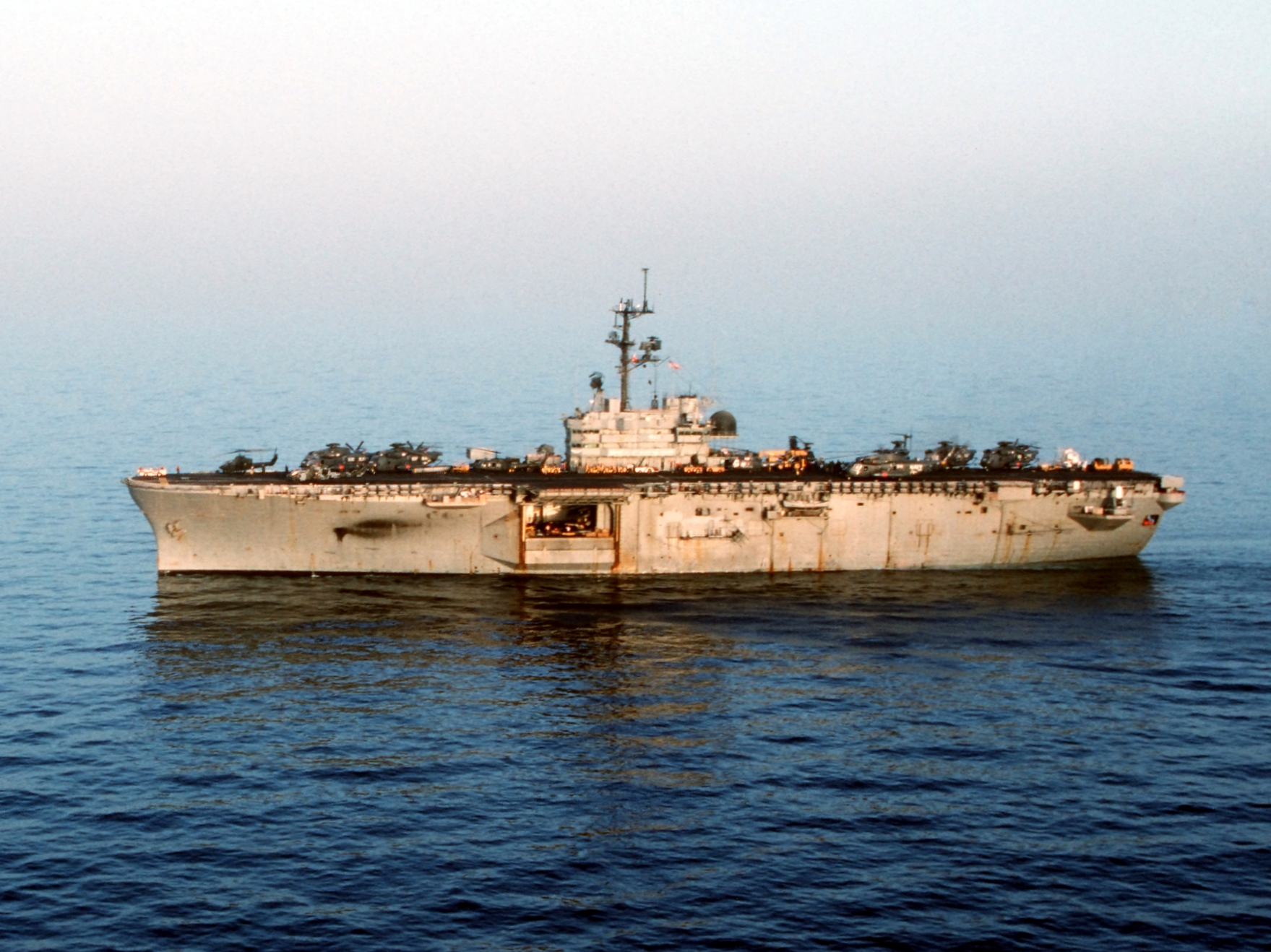
USS Okinawa, a former U.S. LPH. Since the final vessel was decommissioned in 2002, the U.S. no longer uses LPH ships.

=== Brazilian Navy ===
- Atlântico (ex HMS Ocean (L12))

=== Libya ===
- Ibn ouf class
  - ibn ouf (132)- minimal conversion in 2009. to carry one helicopter
  - ibn haritha(134)- currently in italy, refitted in 2009 with same capability as ibn ouf

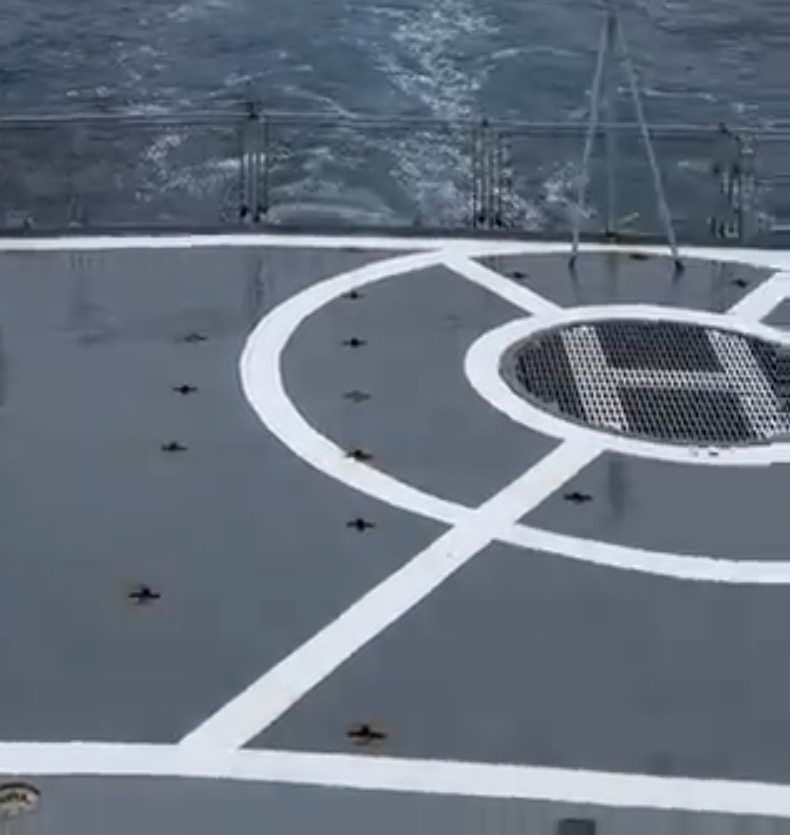
Helicopter grid (ibn ouf)

=== Republic of Korea Navy ===
- Dokdo-class amphibious assault ship
  - ROKS Dokdo
  - ROKS Marado

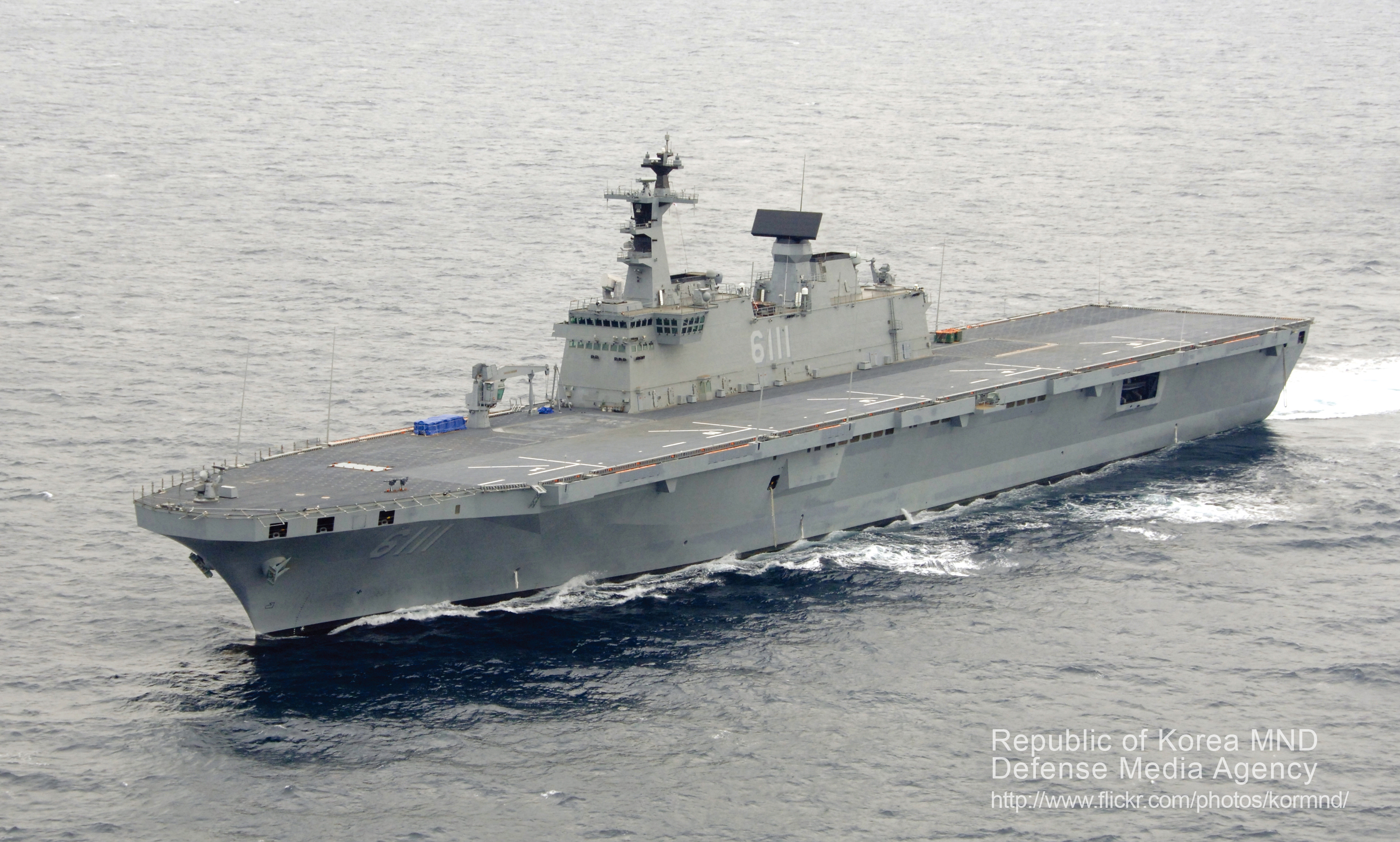
ROKS Dokdo in 2010

=== Royal Navy ===
Royal Navy "Commando Carriers" and "Amphibious Helicopter Carriers"

- HMS Ocean (R68) – 1956 only, emergency minimal conversion for Suez Crisis Colossus-class aircraft carrier - Broken up
- HMS Theseus – 1956 only, emergency minimal conversion for Suez Crisis Colossus class. Placed into reserve until broken up in 1962
- HMS Albion – 1962–1972, converted Centaur-class aircraft carrier - Converted to a Commando carrier in 1961/62. Decommissioned 1972 and scrapped.
- HMS Bulwark – 1960–1980, converted Centaur class. Converted to an anti-submarine warfare carrier 1979. Kept in service until HMS Invincible entered service. Due to accumulated damage she was not fit for emergency use in the Falklands War and was later broken up.
- HMS Hermes – 1973–1976, Centaur-class aircraft carrier converted for amphibious operations, then in 1976 as a helicopter anti-submarine warfare carrier and later still as a BAe Sea Harrier-equipped VSTOL light carrier. During the Falklands operated helicopters for both anti-submarine and troop movements Sold to the Indian Navy, as the INS Viraat.
- HMS Ocean (L12) – 1998–2018 designed and built as a commando carrier based on the Invincible-class STOVL carrier hull. Decommissioned in March 2018 sold to Brazil, who renamed it Atlântico.
- HMS Illustrious - 2011–2014, Invincible-class aircraft carrier equipped and re-purposed as a commando carrier while HMS Ocean was in refit. Decommissioned in 2014 and scrapped in Turkey.

=== United States Navy ===
- USS Block Island – Commencement Bay-class escort carrier – Conversion to LPH cancelled -Scrapped
- USS Iwo Jima – Iwo Jima-class amphibious assault ship – First ship to be designed and built from the keel up as an amphibious assault ship - Scrapped
- USS Okinawa – Iwo Jima class - Sunk in SINKEX
- USS Boxer – converted straight deck Essex-class aircraft carrier - Scrapped
- USS Princeton – converted straight deck Essex-class aircraft carrier - Scrapped
- USS Thetis Bay – converted Casablanca-class escort carrier - Scrapped
- USS Guadalcanal – Iwo Jima-class - Sunk in SINKEX
- USS Valley Forge – converted straight deck Essex-class aircraft carrier - Scrapped
- USS Guam – Iwo Jima class - Sunk in SINKEX
- USS Tripoli – Iwo Jima class – Scrapped
- USS New Orleans – Iwo Jima class - Sunk in SINKEX off of the coast of Oahu, Hawaii.
- USS Inchon – Iwo Jima class - Stricken from the list and sunk east of Virginia Beach, Virginia on 5 December 2004.

== See also ==
- Helicopter carrier
- List of amphibious warfare ships
- List of United States Navy amphibious warfare ships § Landing Platform Helicopter (LPH)
