= Hahella chejuensis =

Scientific classification
- Domain: Bacteria
- Kingdom: Pseudomonadati
- Phylum: Pseudomonadota
- Class: Gammaproteobacteria
- Order: Oceanospirillales
- Family: Hahellaceae
- Genus: Hahella
- Species: H. chejuensis

Binomial name
- Hahella chejuensis Lee et al. 2001

Type strain
- IMSNU 11157, KCTC 2396, strain 96CJ10356

Species of bacterium

Hahella chejuensis is a Gram-negative, aerobic, rod-shaped and motile bacterium from the genus of Hahella which has been isolated from Marado in Korea.
