= Hahella =

Scientific classification
- Domain: Bacteria
- Kingdom: Pseudomonadati
- Phylum: Pseudomonadota
- Class: Gammaproteobacteria
- Order: Oceanospirillales
- Family: Hahellaceae
- Genus: Hahella; Lee et al. 2001

Type species
- Hahella chejuensis

Species
- H. antarctica H. chejuensis H. ganghwensis

Genus of bacteria

Hahella is a Gram-negative, facultatively anaerobic genus of bacteria from the family of Hahellaceae.
