= Allohahella marinimesophila =

Scientific classification
- Domain: Bacteria
- Kingdom: Pseudomonadati
- Phylum: Pseudomonadota
- Class: Gammaproteobacteria
- Order: Oceanospirillales
- Family: Hahellaceae
- Genus: Allohahella
- Species: A. marinimesophila

Binomial name
- Allohahella marinimesophila Han et al. 2016

Type strain
- CGMCC 1.10800, JCM 17555, JCM 17555

Species of bacterium

Allohahella marinimesophila is a Gram-negative, non-endospore-forming and strictly aerobic bacterium from the genus of Allohahella which has been isolated from seawater from the Yellow Sea.
