= Hahella ganghwensis =

Scientific classification
- Domain: Bacteria
- Kingdom: Pseudomonadati
- Phylum: Pseudomonadota
- Class: Gammaproteobacteria
- Order: Oceanospirillales
- Family: Hahellaceae
- Genus: Hahella
- Species: H. ganghwensis

Binomial name
- Hahella ganghwensis Baik et al. 2005

Type strain
- DSM 17046, FR1050, JCM 12486, KCTC 12277

Species of bacterium

Hahella gaghwensis is a marine strain of Gram-negative, aerobic, and obligately halophilic bacteria of the gammaproteobacteria. Unlike its relative, H. chejuensis, H. ganghwensis is obligately halophilic, and both have distinctly different metabolic capabilities and fatty acid content.

== Morphology ==
Hahella ganghwensis forms a round, smooth, and convex colony with rod-shaped cells that are motile via the propulsion of a unipolar flagellum. The colony has a cream color, as opposed to the red pigment seen in H. chejuensis and this can be used in situ to differentiate between the two.

== Isolation ==
Hahella gaghwensis was first characterized from isolates obtained from the Ganghwen Island off of the coast of South Korea. It was discovered in 2005 while South Korean researchers were conducting studies of diversity for the known species, H. chejuensis. They determined through 16S rRNA sequencing that a strain, FR1050, was distinct enough from model H. chejuensis rRNA to warrant description as a separate species, and further research showed various biochemical and physiological differences

== Metabolism ==
Notable for the aerobic microbe is the ability of H. ganghwensis to produce an overabundance of extracellular polysaccharides. Though it is incapable of nitrate reduction, it does favor N-acetylglucosamine for growth. It does not grow in the presence of nitrate, adipate, gluconate, or caprate

== Phylogeny ==
Based on 16S rRNA sequencing, the closest relatives were H. chejuensis strain KCTC 2396T (94.7%), Zooshikella ganghwensis strain JC2044T (90.1%) and Microbulbifer hydrolyticus strain DSM 11525T (90.7%). It is in the gamma proteobacteria, but has no known industrial or human health affects, and more research will be required in order to determine the niche that the bacterial strain occupies.
