= Halospina =

Scientific classification
- Domain: Bacteria
- Kingdom: Pseudomonadati
- Phylum: Pseudomonadota
- Class: Gammaproteobacteria
- Order: Oceanospirillales
- Family: Hahellaceae
- Genus: Halospina; Sorokin et al. 2006

Type species
- Halospina denitrificans

Species
- H. denitrificans

Genus of bacteria

Halospina is an extremely halophilic genus of gram-negative bacteria from the family of Hahellaceae with one known species (Halospina denitrificans). Halospina denitrificans has been isolated from sediments from a hypersaline lake.
