= Marado =

Southernmost island of South Korea

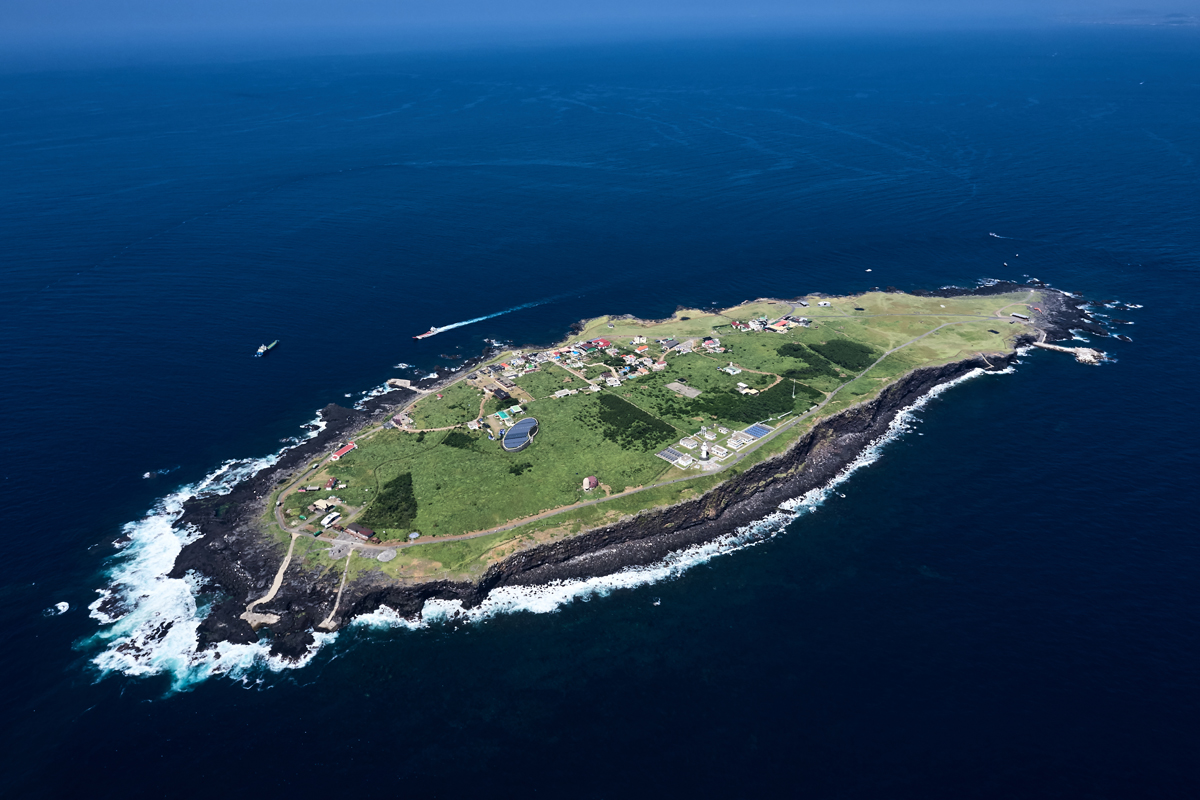
- Marado from the sky (2016)
- Interactive map of Marado

Geography
- Coordinates: 33°07′N 126°16′E
- Adjacent to: Korean Strait
- Area: 0.3 km^{2} (0.12 sq mi)
- Coastline: 4.2 km (2.61 mi)

Administration
- South Korea

Demographics
- Population: 90

Korean name
- Hangul: 마라도
- Hanja: 馬羅島
- RR: Marado
- MR: Marado

Marado (Korean: 마라도) or Mara Island is an island in Jeju Province, South Korea. It is South Korea's southernmost island, and is 8 km (5.0 mi) off the south coast of Jeju Island.

It has an area of 0.3 km^{2} (0.12 sq mi) and is home to about 90 people. It has long been reputed for having strong women and docile men. In recent years, tourists have come to see its unusual rock formations. It is accessible from Jeju via ferries and excursion boats.

Mara-do is within the administrative boundaries of Daejeong Township (Daejeong-eup) in Seogwipo City, and is included, along with Gapado, in Gapa-ri, and is South Korea's southernmost point.

Because of its subtropical marine habitat the island is a natural reserve. It was designated as National Monument no. 423 (천연기념물 제423호) on July 18, 2000.

== Overview ==
Marado was originally uninhabited. It was known as Keumdo (금도,禁島), which means forbidden island. According to a The Chosun Ilbo article published by Lee Kyu-tae in 1967, the island was first occupied by a woman named Kim Seong-oh (김성오, 金成五) and her brothers in 1880. As a poor peasant with no land to farm, Kim Seong-oh decided to move to the island when her father mentioned the island on his deathbed. So Kim left Jeju with her two brothers, farming tools, and some seeds. They had to circle the island around three times, because they couldn't find a place to dock their boat. After about 10 years, they were joined by two stranded fishermen from Torishima (도리섬,鳥島), in the Kingdom of Ryukyu.

However, documents from Jeju county also had another story on Marado. According to this story, the first residents came to live on Marado in 1883. One Mr. Kim originally living in Daejeong gol, a small village in Jeju, ran through all his fortune. His relatives proposed to let them move to Marado. Sim Hyun Taek, pastor of Jeju at that time, permitted them to do so, and Marado became inhabited for the first time. After independence, it was administered by Gapa-ri, Daejeong-eup of Jeju, and registered as an independent township(ri) called Marari.

== Coastline ==
Marado is an island with an exceptionally rocky coastline; sea caves are found on the island as well. The overall length of the island's coastline is 4.2 km (2.6 mi). There is a walking track around the island offering a scenic view of the coast. Walking on foot around the island takes about one hour.

Due to tidal erosion, the east coast consists of extremely steep cliffs called Gue Jeong by residents. Their altitude extends to 39m and plants such as Korean cacti and ditch deeds are found here.

There are four docks on Marado, called Sal-rae duck, Jariduck, Jangsiduck and Sinjak-no, respectively. Fishery resources are largely abundant throughout the year, especially in Jariduck.

== Present ==
There is an elementary school, police station, church, a temple and lighthouse on Marado. Forty households are registered here and about 700 tourists a day come to visit. For them, fifty accommodations have been provided.

== Environment ==
Marado's coastal features and basalt rocks are the best for many fish, ear shells, turban shells and seaweeds. There used to be no trees on the island, but a small forest was planted in the middle of the island. It is protected by a fence.

== Tourism ==
=== Solar power plants ===
There are solar power plants located on the northern coast of Marado, a scarce sight in South Korea. Combined capacity is about 30 kilowatts (40 hp); the plants provide 27 households with electricity.

=== Chocco Museum ===
This small museum is one of the main landmarks in Marado, built in a Renaissance style.

=== Cheonyeodang Temple ===
Cheonyeodang is a sightworthy small temple in the only village on Marado. In this temple, people pray for the divers' safety.

=== Janggun Rock ===
Janggun Rock means "General's Rock". Traditionally, the island's inhabitants consider this rock as a guardian. It is quite common for shore-dwellers to believe in nature and natural phenomena, and Janggun rock is sacred for Marado's residents.

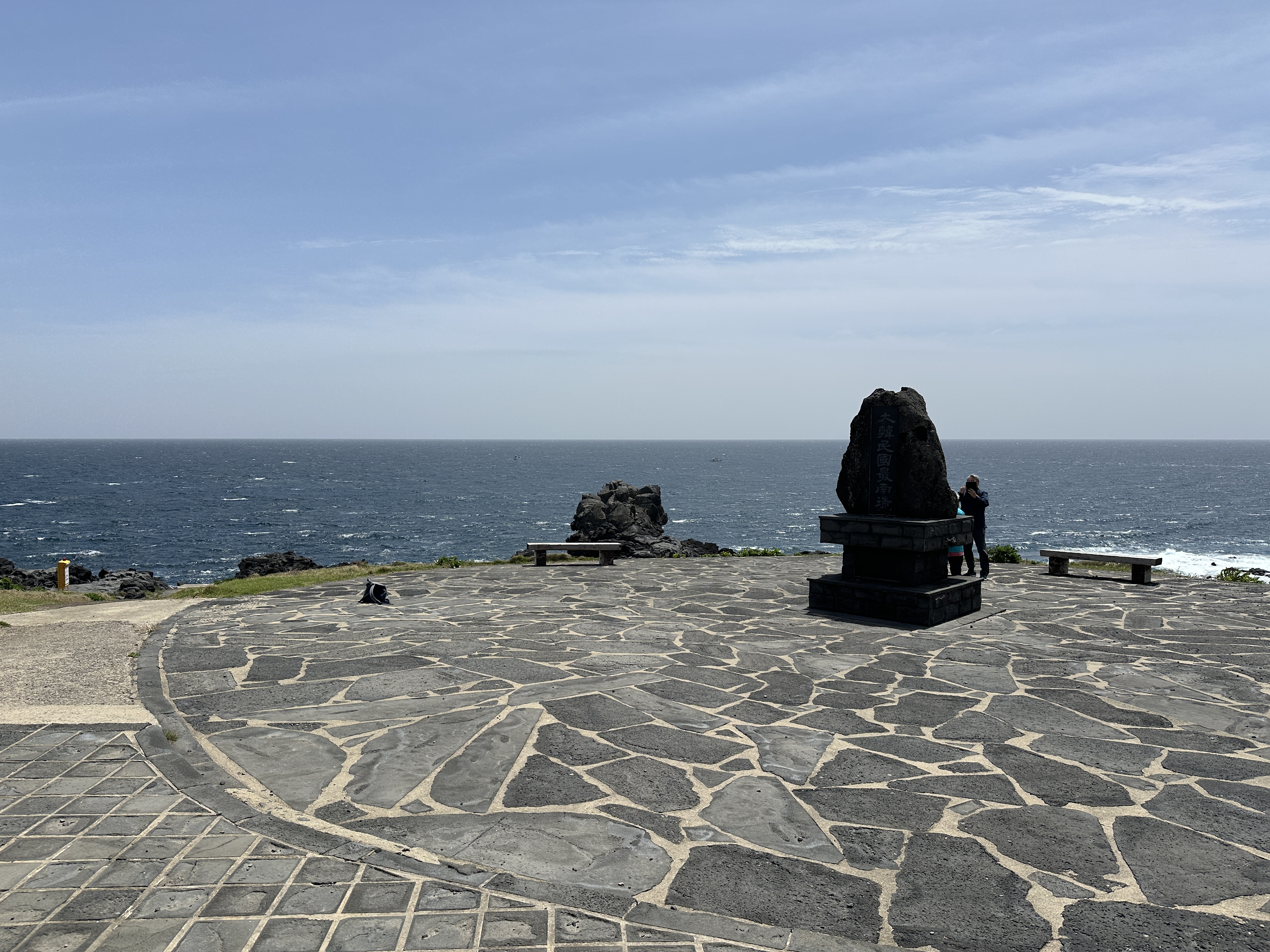
The southernmost point of South Korea (2026)

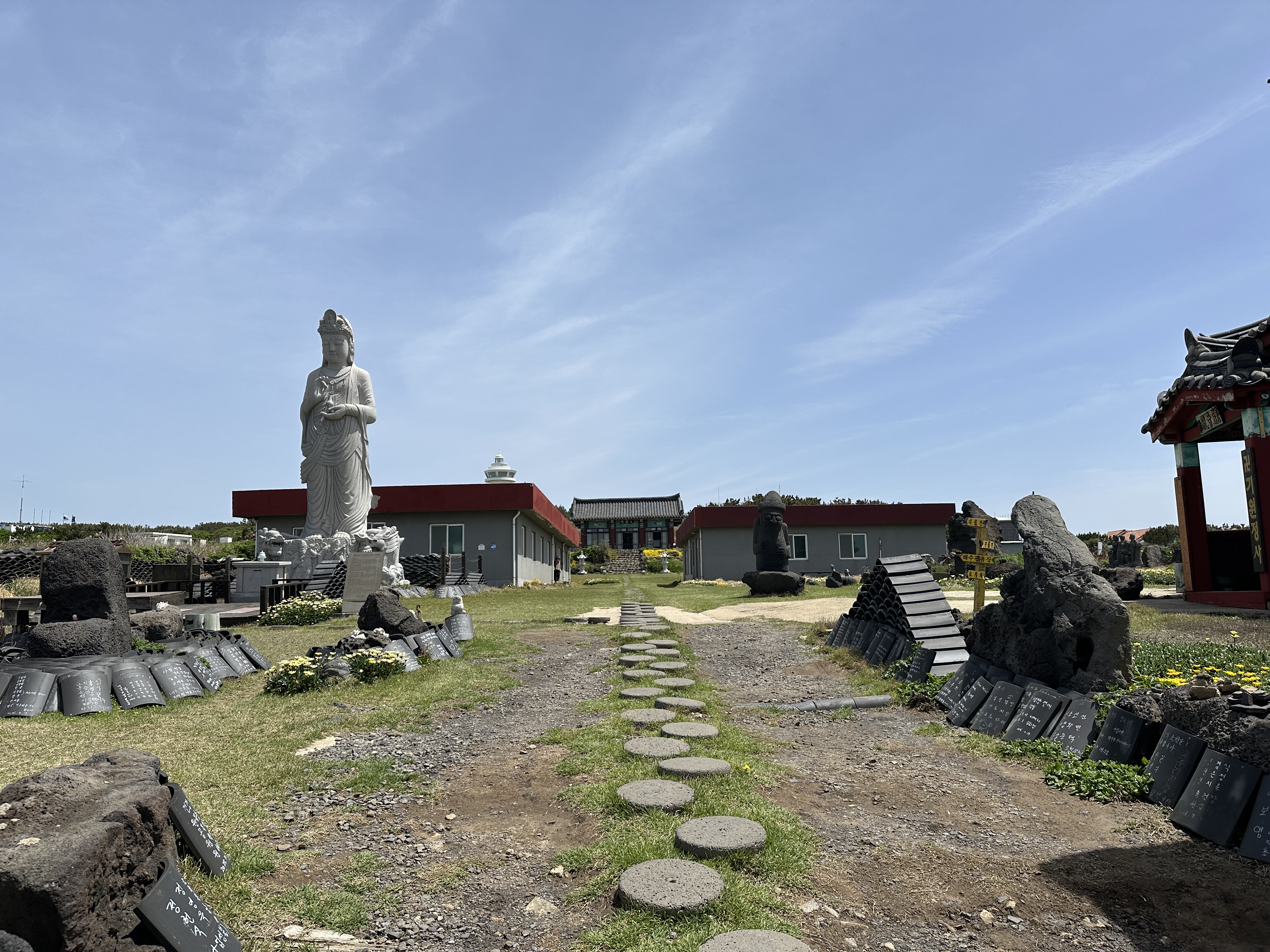
The temple Giwonjeongsa (기원정사) on the island (2026)

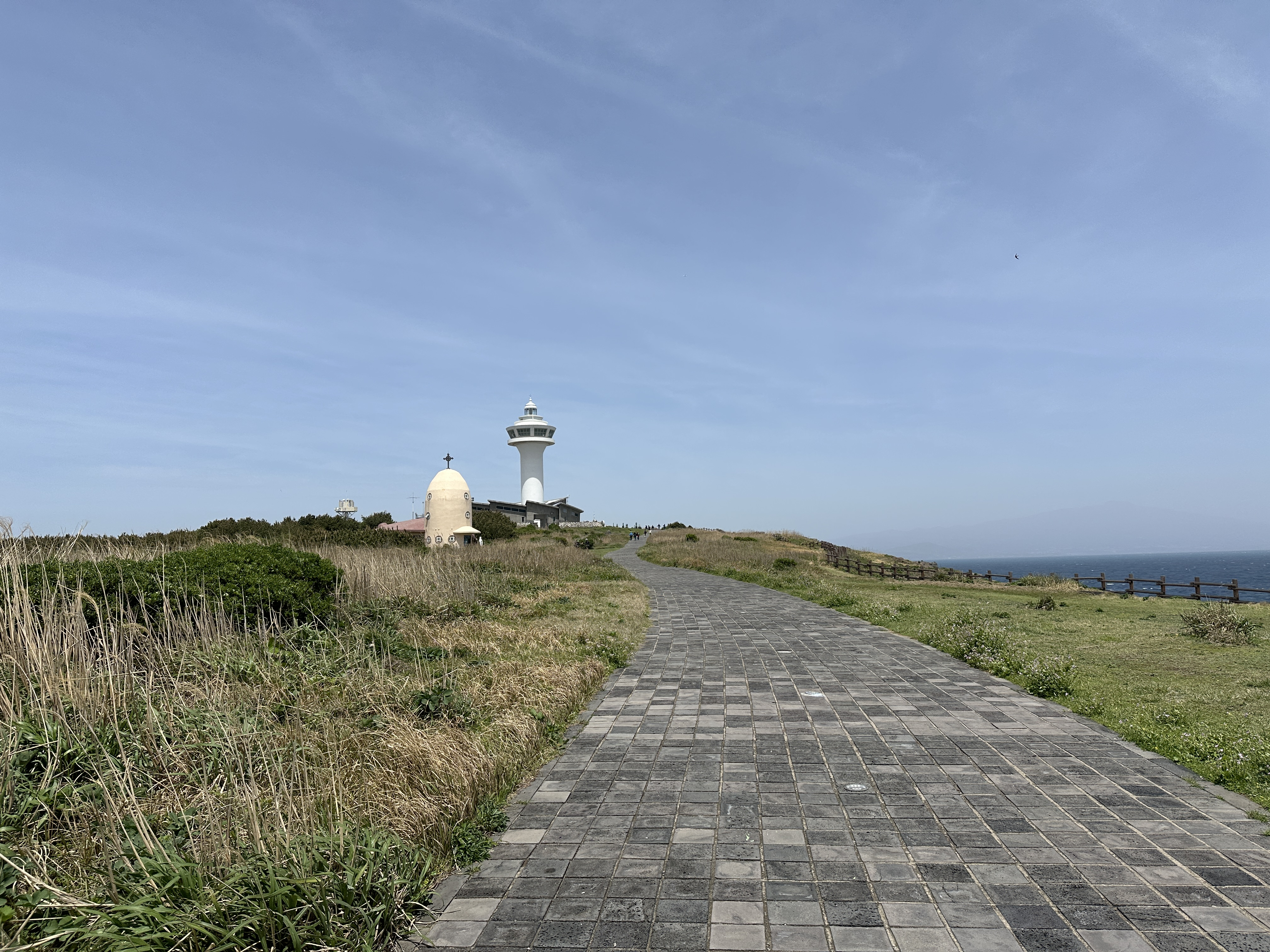
Church and lighthouse on the island (2026)

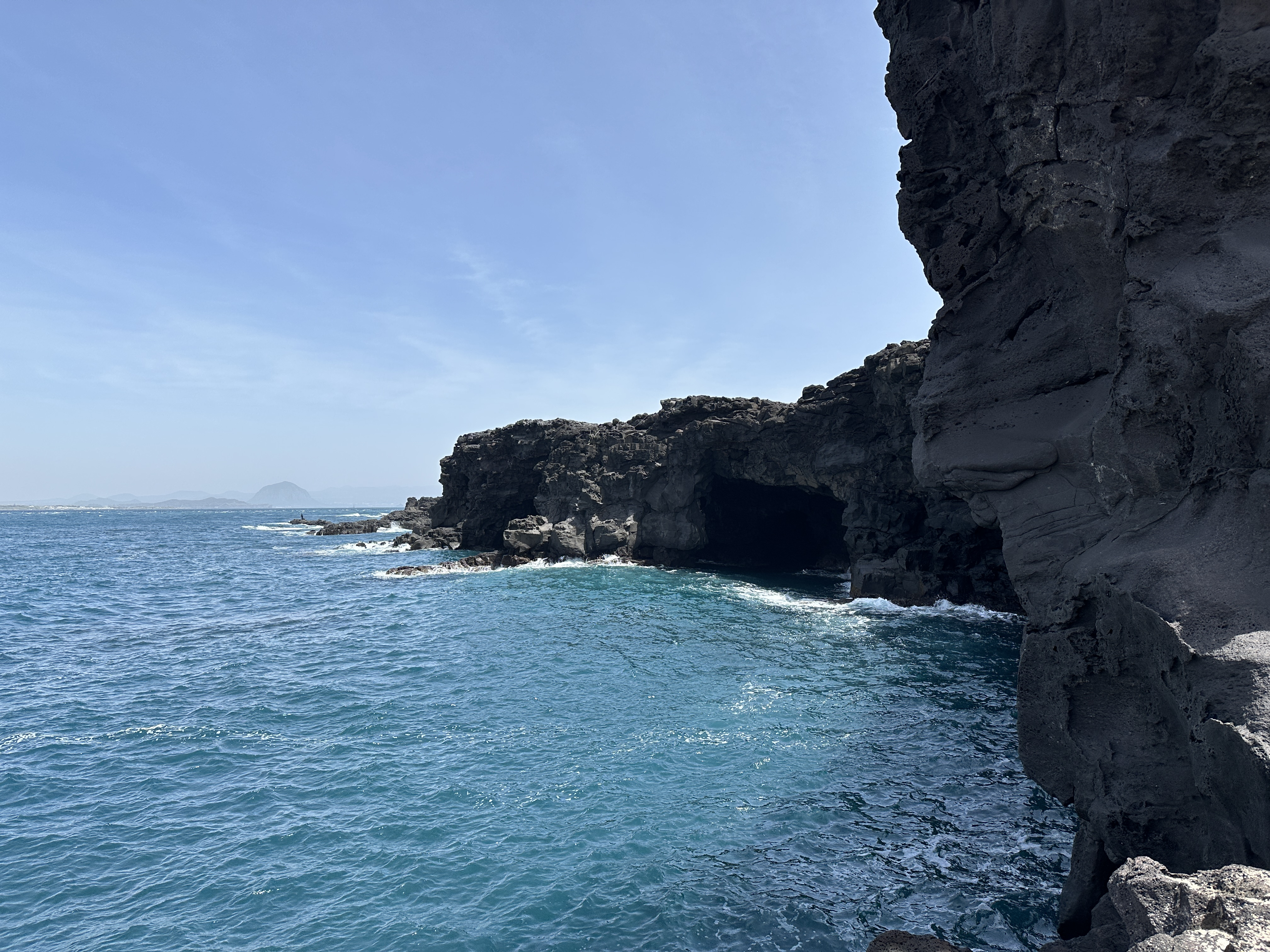
Cliffs (2026)

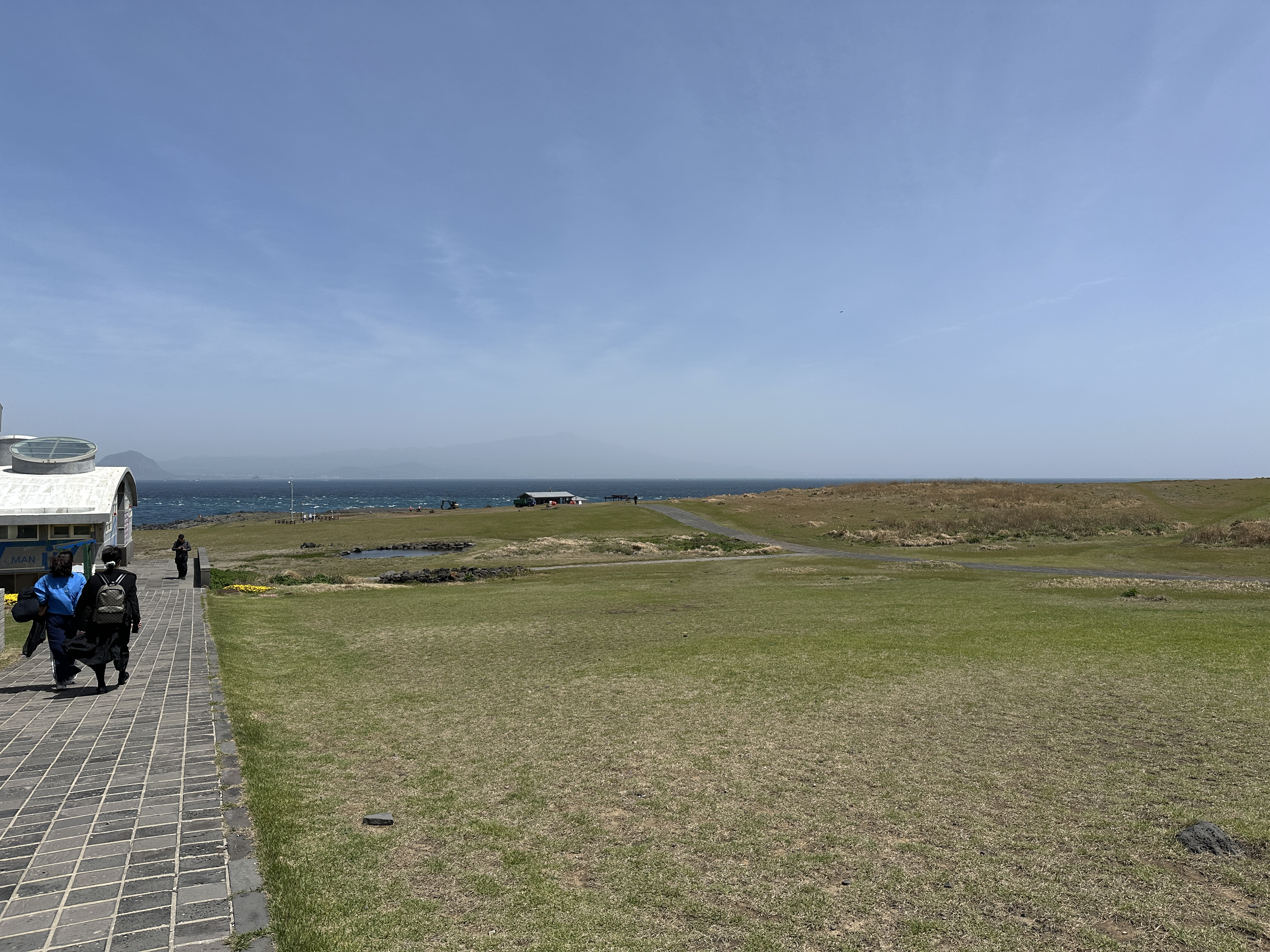
South of the island (2026)

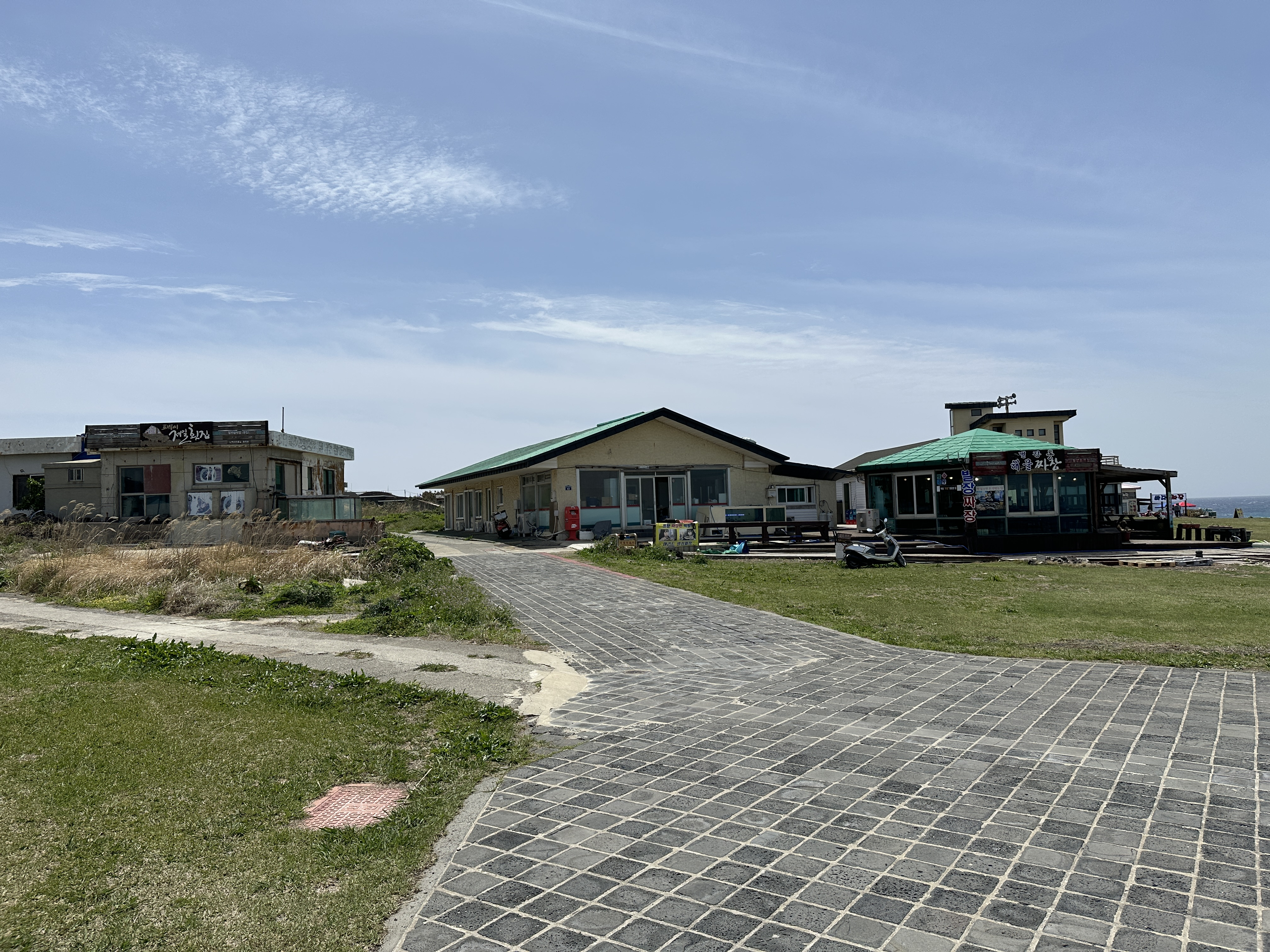
Buildings of the town (2026)

== See also ==
- Islands of South Korea
- ROKS Marado, a Dokdo-class amphibious assault ship.
