= Allohahella =

Scientific classification
- Domain: Bacteria
- Kingdom: Pseudomonadati
- Phylum: Pseudomonadota
- Class: Gammaproteobacteria
- Order: Oceanospirillales
- Family: Hahellaceae
- Genus: Allohahella; Han et al. 2016

Type species
- Allohahella antarctica

Species
- A. antarctica A. marinimesophila

Genus of bacteria

Allohahella is a genus of bacteria from the family of Hahellaceae.
