= Allohahella antarctica =

Scientific classification
- Domain: Bacteria
- Kingdom: Pseudomonadati
- Phylum: Pseudomonadota
- Class: Gammaproteobacteria
- Order: Oceanospirillales
- Family: Hahellaceae
- Genus: Allohahella
- Species: A. antarctica

Binomial name
- Allohahella antarctica (Lee et al. 2008) Han et al. 2016

Type strain
- KCCM 42675, NBRC 102683

Synonyms
- Hahella antarctica

Species of bacterium

Allohahella antarctica is a Gram-negative, psychrotolerant, aerobic and chemoheterotrophic bacterium from the genus of Allohahella which has been isolated from seawater from the Antarctic.
