= CVX-class aircraft carrier =

Class of South Korean aircraft carriers

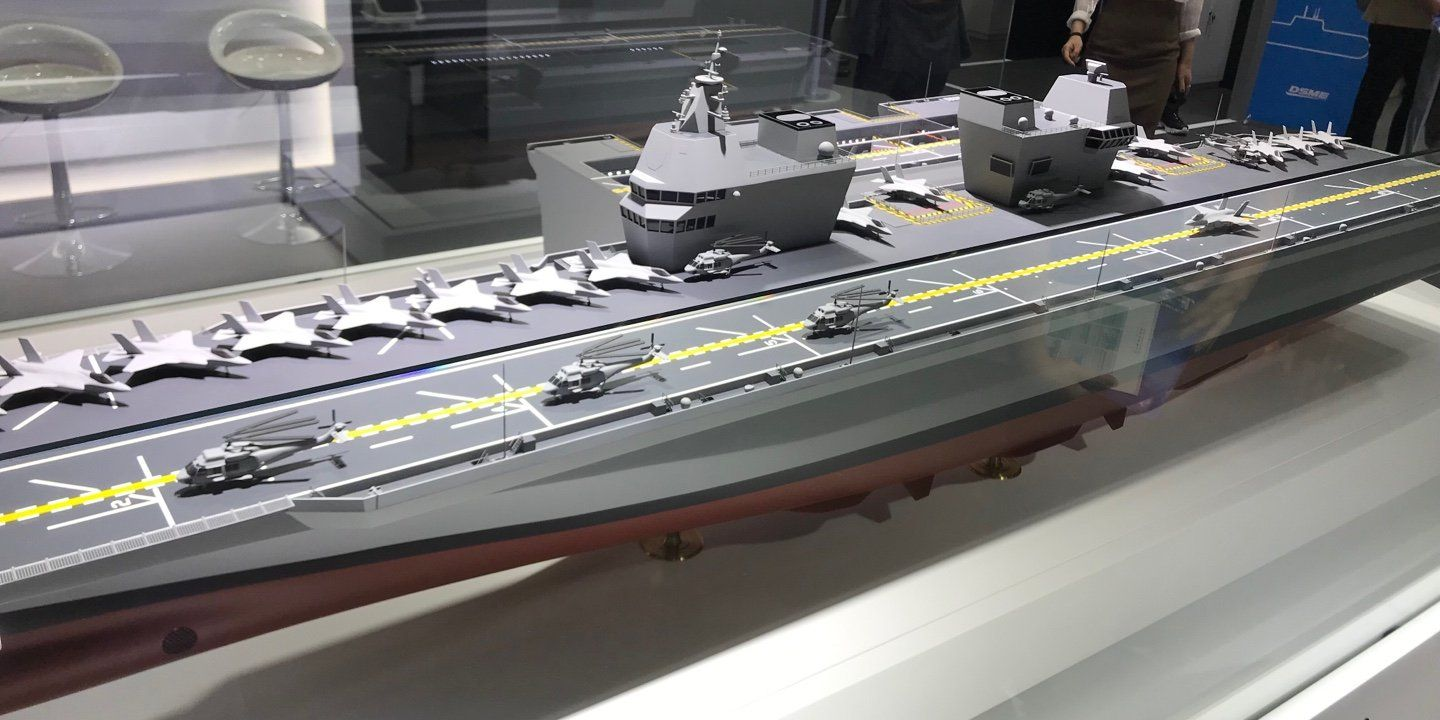
- Conceptual Model of DSME proposal

Class overview
- Name: CVX
- Builders: Hyundai Heavy Industries
- Operators: Republic of Korea Navy
- Preceded by: Dokdo class
- Planned: 2 (cancelled)

General characteristics
- Type: Aircraft carrier
- Displacement: 45,000 tons
- Length: 263 metres (863 ft)
- Beam: 46.6 metres (153 ft)
- Speed: 27 knots (50 km/h; 31 mph) maximum

The CVX (formerly known as LPX-II, Hangul: 대형수송함-II) was a class of aircraft carriers proposed for the Republic of Korea Navy. The class was intended to follow-on from the previous Dokdo-class amphibious assault ships which prioritized amphibious capability, while the CVX will be designed for fixed wing and rotary wing operations instead, constituting a traditional aircraft carrier. The planned development of the class was formally announced and funded as part of the 2020~2024 Mid-Term Defense Plan (국방중기계획) under the Moon Jae-in presidency, published in December 2020.

During the Yoon Suk Yeol presidency, which began in 2022, the administration was however not supportive of the CVX project, and it was not funded in the 2023 and 2024 defense budgets. In May 2025, the CVX was suspended and revised in favour of a command ship for UAVs under the "Multipurpose Manned and Unmanned Force Command Ship" program".

== Background ==
The introduction of the CVX into service is a continuation of the development of a blue water navy by the Republic of Korea Navy, a process begun in 2001. Thus far the program has consisted of the Dokdo-class amphibious assault ships, the Sejong the Great class (KDX-III), Chungmugong Yi Sun-sin class, and Gwanggaeto the Great-class destroyers, the Incheon-class frigates and Type 214 submarines.

The ship had been tentatively named Baengnyeongdo (백령도) since August 2019, when it was renamed from LPX-II to CVX. Opinions are divided among neighboring countries as to the significance of South Korea, which does not currently possess an aircraft carrier, announcing the construction of a light aircraft carrier. In the first place, the Korean War is still under an armistice, and there are doubts as to whether light aircraft carriers are really necessary in the fight against North Korea, whose air force is not a threat.

Therefore, there are several views that the move is aimed at resisting China, which is intensifying its conflict over territorial, historical and economic issues.

In addition, the United States has repeatedly requested that the cost burden of the U.S. forces stationed in South Korea be significantly increased, and has expressed the view that by reducing dependence on the U.S. military, South Korea aims to gain even a slight advantage in cost-sharing negotiations.

Geopolitically, the environment surrounding South Korea, including North Korea, China, Russia, Japan, and the United States, are far from peaceful, and there is also an intention to build a light aircraft carrier to increase its national defense capabilities.

On June 9, 2021, at the Korean maritime exhibition MADEX, two companies, Daewoo Shipbuilding and Marine Engineering (DSME) and Hyundai Heavy Industries (HHI), exhibited a mock-up of a light aircraft carrier as a new design for CVX.

However, on May 11, 2025, the South Korean Navy announced revisions to its light aircraft carrier plan and announced that it would carry UAVs instead of F-35B fighters.

At the exhibition "Seoul ADEX 2025", which was held from October 17th to 24th, 2025, Hanwha Ocean unveiled the mockup Ghost Commander II, which attracted attention as the South Korean Navy used the CVX concept as a UAV mothership. The company also exhibited a mock-up of the same type of ship at MADEX 2025, and as at that time, the displacement was set at 42,000 tons, which is comparable to the displacement of various CVX proposals.

== Development ==
In late 2020, design and acquisition work on the CVX class was sped up in the hope of countering naval expansions in South Korea's neighbors. This move is expected to bring forward the aircraft carrier's future in-service date by one year, and will require a hastened procurement process for the F-35B fighter jets that the warship will carry. As of February 2021, work on the CVX was intended begin in 2022 and end in 2030.

On the occasion of the MADEX trade fair in South Korea in June 2021, the Italian Fincantieri signed a contract with Daewoo Shipbuilding & Marine Engineering (DSME) for assistance in the design of the CVX. The South Koreans were seeking the support of an industrialist with experience in this field.

The administration led by President Yoon Suk Yeol, who was elected in 2022, is sceptical of the CVX project. The project received no funding in the Korean defence budgets for 2023 and 2024. While it is included in the Mid-term Defense Blueprint covering the period 2024-2028 that was released in December 2023, this document notes that it will be subject to the results of further research. In May 2025, the Navy dropped plans for the CVX in favour of a command ship for UAVs under the "Multipurpose Manned and Unmanned Force Command Ship" program, citing lessons learnt in the ongoing Russian invasion of Ukraine.

== Specifications ==
Unlike the preceding Dokdo class, the CVX will not feature a well deck for amphibious assault craft. Instead, internal space will be dedicated to aircraft storage and maintenance. The flight deck will be of an axial design rather than using a ski-jump (used by other F-35B jet aircraft operators except for the United States Navy).

The CVX will be one of the few aircraft carriers in the world to feature two islands. The UK defense corporation Babcock International has been providing support to the CVX program and is a possible explanation for the twin-island design as Babcock led the development of the Queen Elizabeth-class aircraft carrier program for the Royal Navy.

The Republic of Korea government has stated that the sensor and weapons fit for the CVX will be developed domestically and the ship will feature a multi-function radar (MFR) for ballistic missile defence (BMD). The same system will be used about the next generation KDDX-class destroyer

== Aviation ==
The CVX would have been the first class of aircraft carriers in the Republic of Korea Navy, in contrast to the Dokdo class of amphibious assault ships which have features such as a well deck to accommodate amphibious assault vehicles. The ship would have use of an axial flight deck similar to those used by the Tarawa, Wasp and America-class amphibious assault ships of the United States Navy. The Ministry of National Defense stated in August 2020 that twenty F-35Bs would be procured for the CVX. In terms of rotary wing aviation, the ship would have accommodated the future Marine Attack Helicopters (based on MUH-1 Marineon) of the ROK Marine Corps.

On the December 15, 2021, Democratic Party lawmaker Hong Young-pyo stated at the National Defense Committee's Budget and Settlement Review Subcommittee, "I recognize the need for a light aircraft carrier," but added, "I oppose assuming the carrier-based aircraft will be the F-35B. Doing so would block the light aircraft carrier plan itself."

In September 2022 the Korean Ministry of National Defence announced that 20 additional F-35As would be purchased for the ROKAF in place of the previously intended purchase of F-35Bs that were to have operated from the CVX. At this time Korea Aerospace Industries was offering to develop a navalised version of the KAI KF-21 Boramae to operate from the CVX.
