= ROKS Marado =

Dokdo-class amphibious assault ship

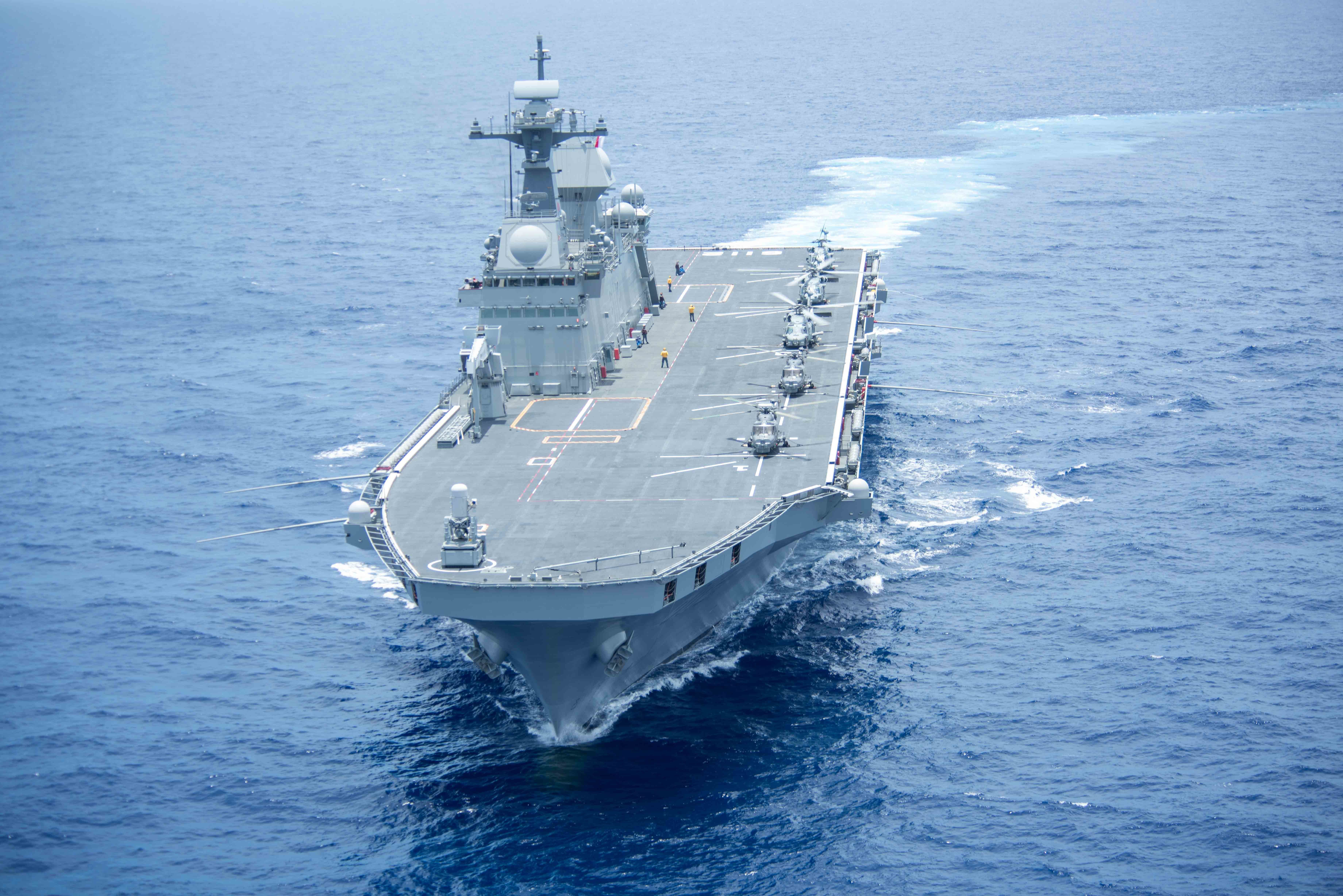
- ROKS Marado in June 2022

History

South Korea
- Name: ROKS Marado
- Namesake: Mara Island
- Operator: Republic of Korea Navy
- Awarded: 23 December 2014
- Builder: Hanjin Heavy Industries & Constructions Co., Busan, South Korea
- Cost: KRW 417,500,000,000 (2014); US$ 365 million
- Laid down: 28 April 2017
- Launched: 14 May 2018
- Commissioned: 28 June 2021
- Home port: Jinhae Naval Base
- Identification: Pennant number: LPH-6112
- Status: Commissioned

General characteristics
- Class & type: Dokdo-class amphibious assault ship
- Displacement: 14,800 tons empty; 19,000 tons full load
- Length: 199 m (652 ft 11 in)
- Beam: 31 m (101 ft 8 in)
- Draught: 7 m (23 ft 0 in)
- Propulsion: 4 SEMT Pielstick 16 PC2.5 STC Diesel engine
- Speed: 23 kn (43 km/h) maximum; 18 kn (33 km/h) cruising
- Boats & landing craft carried: 2 LSF-II or LCAC
- Capacity: Up to 200 vehicles
- Troops: 720 marines, 6 tanks, 7 amphibious assault vehicles
- Crew: 300
- Sensors & processing systems: EL/M-2248 MF-STAR air search radar, SPS-550K surface search radar, AN/SPS-95K navigation radar, TACAN, SAQ-600K IRST
- Electronic warfare & decoys: ESM/ECM:SLQ-200(v)5K SONATA, Chaff launcher
- Armament: 2x Phalanx CIWS, 4x K-VLS cells
- Aircraft carried: Up to 15 helicopters (15 UH-60 Black Hawk or 10 SH-60F Ocean Hawk helicopters)
- Aviation facilities: Flight deck with 5 landing spots and hangar

ROKS Marado (LPH-6112) is the second ship of the Dokdo-class amphibious assault ship of the Republic of Korea Navy.

== Differences with ROKS Dokdo ==
Marado was built with some changes compared to the lead ship ROKS Dokdo. The flight deck is adapted to accommodate two V-22 Ospreys, while Dokdo was able to only carry one. In place of the Thales SMART-L multibeam radar and MW08 surveillance radar, Marado uses the Elta Systems EL/M-2248 MF-STAR multifunction surveillance radar and LIG Nex1 SPS-550K 3-D air and surface surveillance radar. She also has a different weapons suite than the 30 mm Goalkeeper and RAM, instead using two 20 mm Phalanx CIWS and having a K-VLS at the rear of the superstructure for the locally developed K-SAAM.

== Construction and career ==
The Marado was launched on 14 May 2018 at the shipyard of Hanjin Heavy Industries & Constructions Co. in Busan. The Marado was commissioned on 28 June 2021 and is based at the Jinhae Naval Base.

Marado was originally planned to enter service 2010. But due to the economic crisis of 2008 the second ship of the Dokdo-class amphibious assault ship was cancelled. In 2012 the budget was restored after the rise of tensions in the region.

Construction started in November 2016 with the first steel being cut. The keel was laid down in April the following year and the launch occurring another year later. The following two years consisted of fitting-out and going through sea trials. The ship was commissioned on 28 June 2021 .

In May 2022, the ROKN announced that the Marado and the Sohn Won-yil-class submarine, ROKS Shin Dol-seok SS-082, will take part in the RIMPAC 2022.

== See also ==
- HTMS Chakri Naruebet
- Italian aircraft carrier Giuseppe Garibaldi
- Hyūga-class helicopter destroyer
- Project 23900 amphibious assault ship
