= Dokdo-class amphibious assault ship =

Class of South Korean LPH assault ships

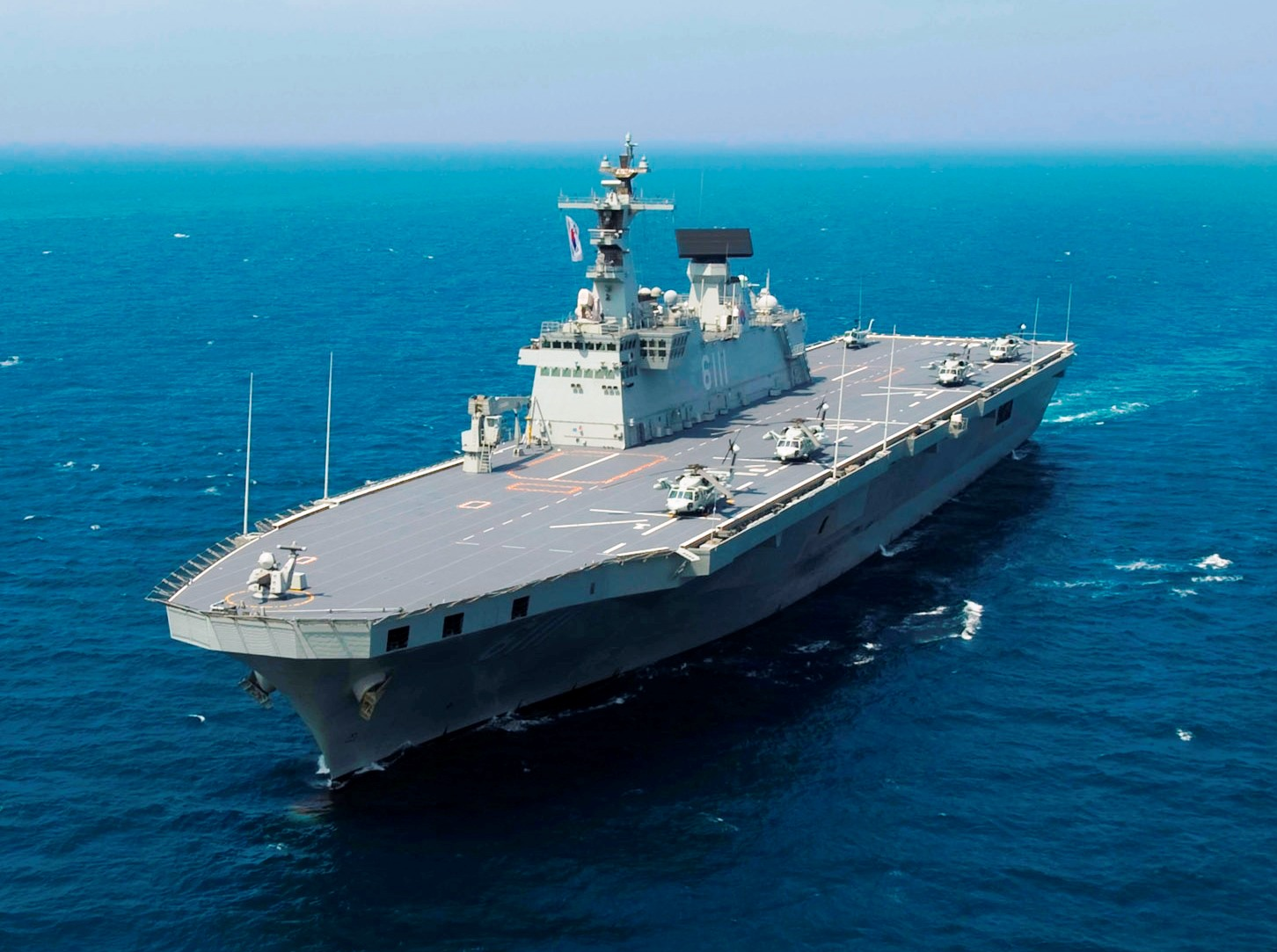
- ROKS Dokdo steams in the East Sea in 2010

Class overview
- Name: Dokdo class
- Builders: Hanjin Heavy Industries
- Operators: Republic of Korea Navy
- Succeeded by: CVX (Planned)
- Cost: KRW 325,770,000,000 (2005); US$ 285 million
- Planned: 2
- Completed: 2
- Active: 2

General characteristics
- Type: Landing platform helicopter
- Displacement: 14,300 tons (empty) / 19,500 tons (full)
- Length: 199 m (652 ft 11 in)
- Beam: 31 m (101 ft 8 in)
- Draught: 7 m (23 ft 0 in)
- Propulsion: 4 SEMT Pielstick 16 PC2.5 STC marine diesel engine; 24 MW (32,000 shp)
- Speed: 23 knots (43 km/h; 26 mph) maximum; 18 knots (33 km/h; 21 mph) cruising
- Boats & landing craft carried: 2 LCAC (LSF-II)
- Capacity: Up to 200 vehicles (including tanks)
- Troops: 720 marines
- Crew: 330
- Sensors & processing systems: SMART-L air search radar; ELM-2248 (MF-STAR) multifunction surveillance radar; MW08 surface search radar; LIG Nex1 SPS-550K; AN/SPS-95K navigation radar; TACAN; VAMPIR-MB optronic sight
- Electronic warfare & decoys: ESM/ECM:SLQ-200(v)5K SONATA, Chaff launcher
- Armament: Guns: LPH-6111: 2 × Goalkeeper CIWS; LPH-6112: 2 × Phalanx CIWS; Missiles: LPH-6111: 1 × RIM-116 Rolling Airframe Missile; LPH-6112: 4 x K-VLS cells
- Aircraft carried: Up to 15 helicopters; (UH-1H, UH-60P or Super Lynx); (Can support VTOL jets)
- Aviation facilities: Flight deck with 5 landing spots and hangar

The Dokdo-class amphibious assault ship (독도급 대형수송함; 獨島級 大型輸送艦) is a class of landing platform helicopter (LPH) and amphibious assault ships operated by the Republic of Korea Navy (ROKN). It was designed and built by Hanjin Heavy Industries (HHIC) to enhance South Korea's amphibious operation capability in terms of assault and military operations other than war (MOOTW).

== Development ==
The ROK Navy required a landing ship with amphibious capabilities in its program to build a blue-water navy which was met by the Dokdo design. The Solgae-class LCAC — made by HHIC — was selected as the landing craft air cushion (LCAC) to operate from the ship.

== Specifications ==
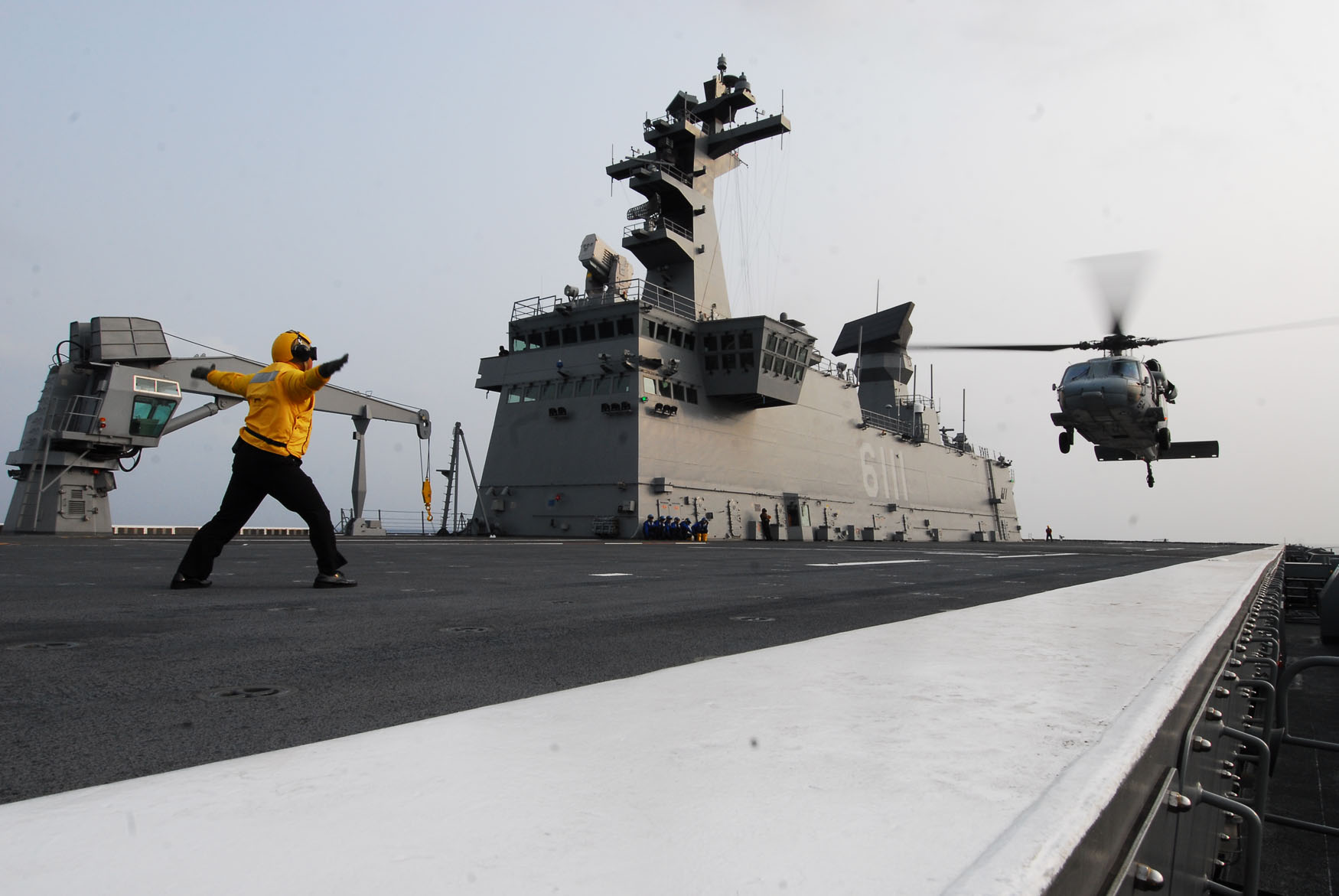
A US Navy MH-60S landing on the flight deck of Dokdo.

The LPX is an amphibious warfare ship with a well deck to accommodate amphibious assault vehicles (AAVs) and two LCACs, the first of which (LSF 631) was acquired in April 2007. The ship is 199 meters (652 ft 11 in) long, 31 meters (101 ft 8 in) wide, with a 14,000-ton (empty) or 18,000-ton (full) displacement, and was built incorporating stealth technologies.

As a high-speed amphibious ship, the LPX was based on the concept of "over-the-horizon assault." The idea comprises a military operation in which an amphibious landing is conducted with high-speed air-cushioned vehicles and helicopters from beyond the horizon, where the enemy cannot easily detect or attack them. The conventional landing ship tank (LST) has to approach the coastline for landing, at the risk of being fired upon by the enemy.

The LPX has a carrying limit of 720 marines and 300-plus crew members, ten tanks, ten trucks, 7 AAVs, three field artillery pieces, and two LCAC hovercraft. It can also carry ten helicopters when no ground vehicles are on its hangar deck.

The flight surface is also sprayed with urethane, which can support VTOL aircraft. South Korea is considering the purchase of F-35B fighters to operate from its Dokdo-class ships. Currently, the LPX operates mainly UH-1H and UH-60P. However, both are designed for land‐based operations and lack abilities for ship-borne operations, such as protection against damage from salty breezes, making them challenging to operate on-board continuously. The KUH-Amphibious, the sea-based amphibious variant of the KAI Surion, is now under development. Production is planned to commence in late 2015, with some 40 helicopters planned.

Self-defense armament includes the RIM-116 Rolling Airframe Missile system. The Goalkeeper close-in weapon system (CIWS) was purchased in January 2003 from Thales at a pre-set price of 13,000,000,000 won (roughly $15,000,000).

The second ship of the class, Marado, was built with some changes compared to Dokdo. The flight deck is adapted to accommodate two V-22 Ospreys, while Dokdo could only carry one. In place of the Thales SMART-L multibeam radar and MW08 surveillance radar, Marado uses the Elta Systems EL/M-2248 MF-STAR multifunction surveillance radar and LIG Nex1 SPS-550K 3-D air and surface surveillance radar. It also has a different weapons suite than the 30 mm Goalkeeper and RAM, instead using two 20 mm Phalanx CIWS and having a K-VLS at the rear of the superstructure for the locally developed K-SAAM.

Dokdo is similar in size to the light aircraft carriers derived from the Sea Control Ship, such as the Spanish Navy's former aircraft carrier Príncipe de Asturias and the Royal Thai Navy's Chakri Naruebet.

== Ships in the class ==
Name	Pennant number	Builder	Launched	Commissioned	Status
ROKS Dokdo	LPH-6111	Hanjin Heavy Industries	12 July 2005	3 July 2007	Active
ROKS Marado	LPH-6112	Hanjin Heavy Industries	14 May 2018	28 June 2021	Active

== Plans ==
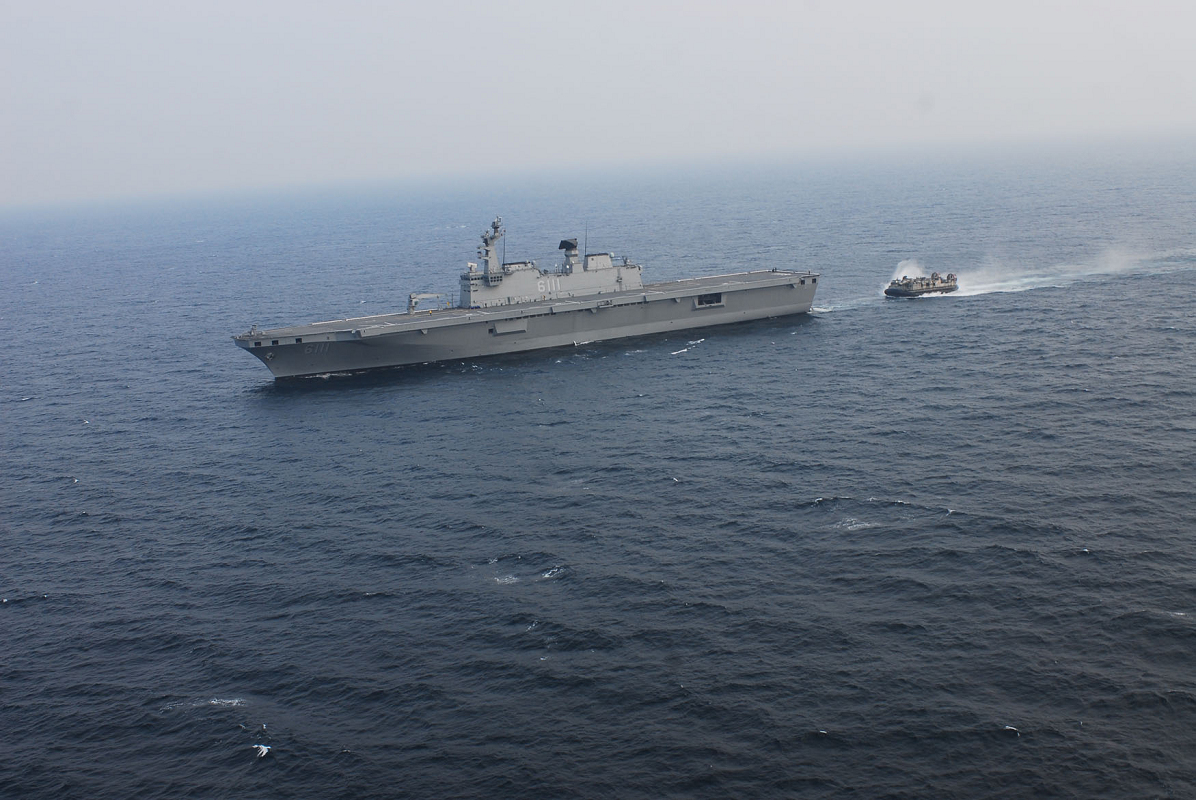
Dokdo conducts well-deck operations with a US Navy LCAC.

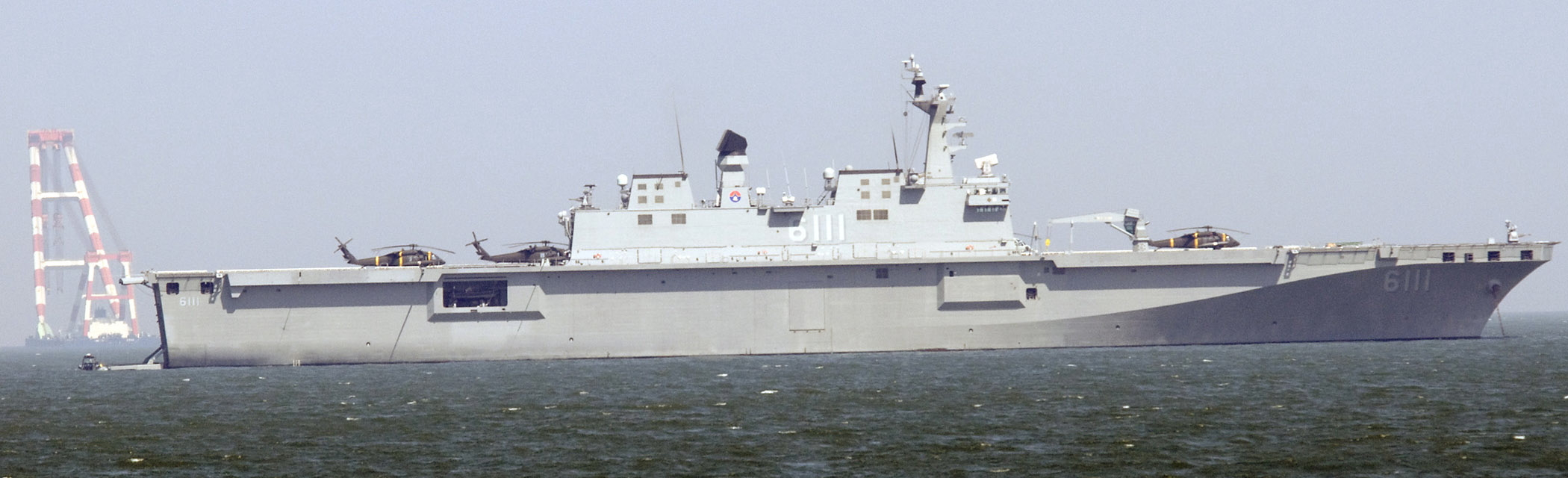
Dokdo assisting search and rescue after the sinking of ROKS Cheonan.

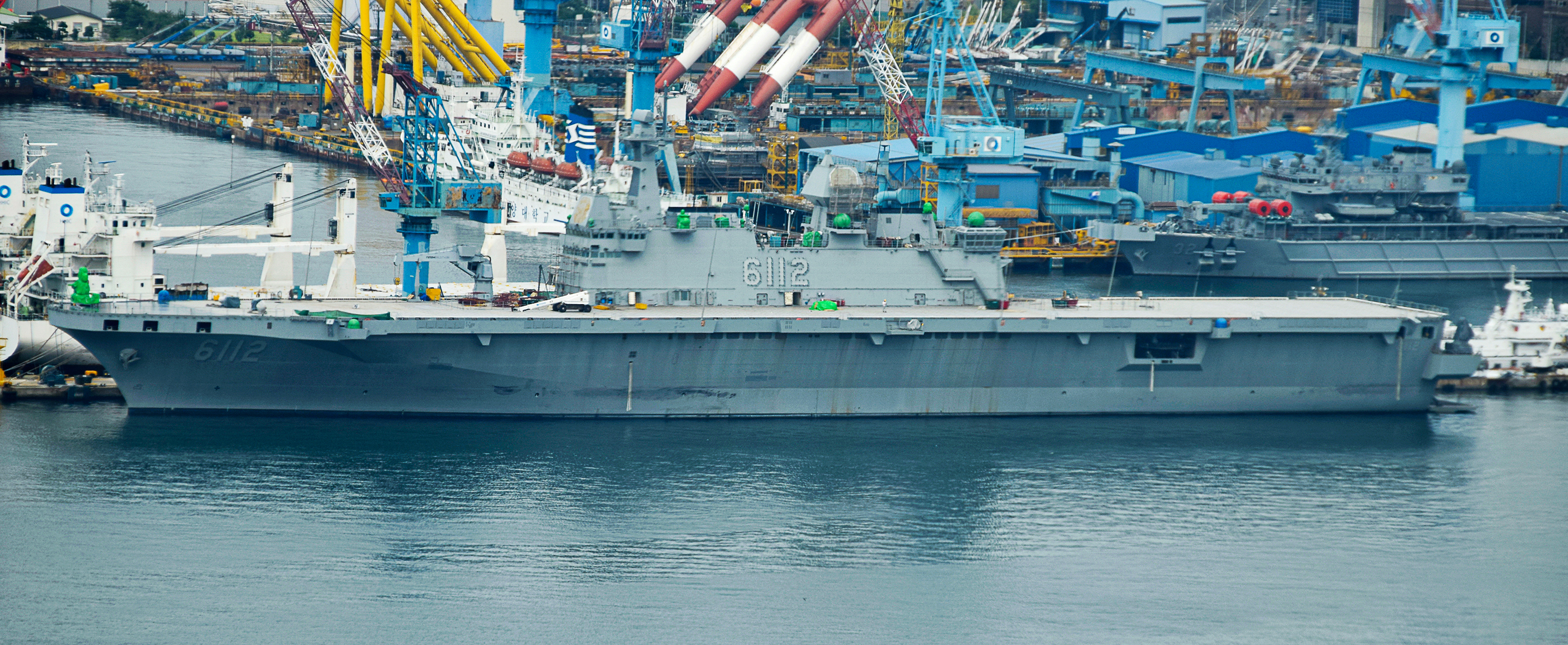
The ROKS Marado in Busan, 2019.

Some proposed uses for the ship include UN peacekeeping operations and disaster relief.

The Korean news agency Yonhap reported in December 2017 that the Korean military was considering operating F-35B aircraft from the Dokdo-class amphibious assault ships. However, as of December 2022, no such plans have been officially declared.

In November 2024, the Republic of Korea Navy tested the Gray Eagle STOL UAV on ROKS Dokdo amphibious assault ship. The Gray Eagle UAV took off from Dokdo, flew twice close to her port side to perform a "simulated landing procedure", but did not land on the ship. It then headed to the Naval Air Command in Pohang and landed on the runway there.
