= ROKS Dokdo =

Dokdo-class amphibious assault ship

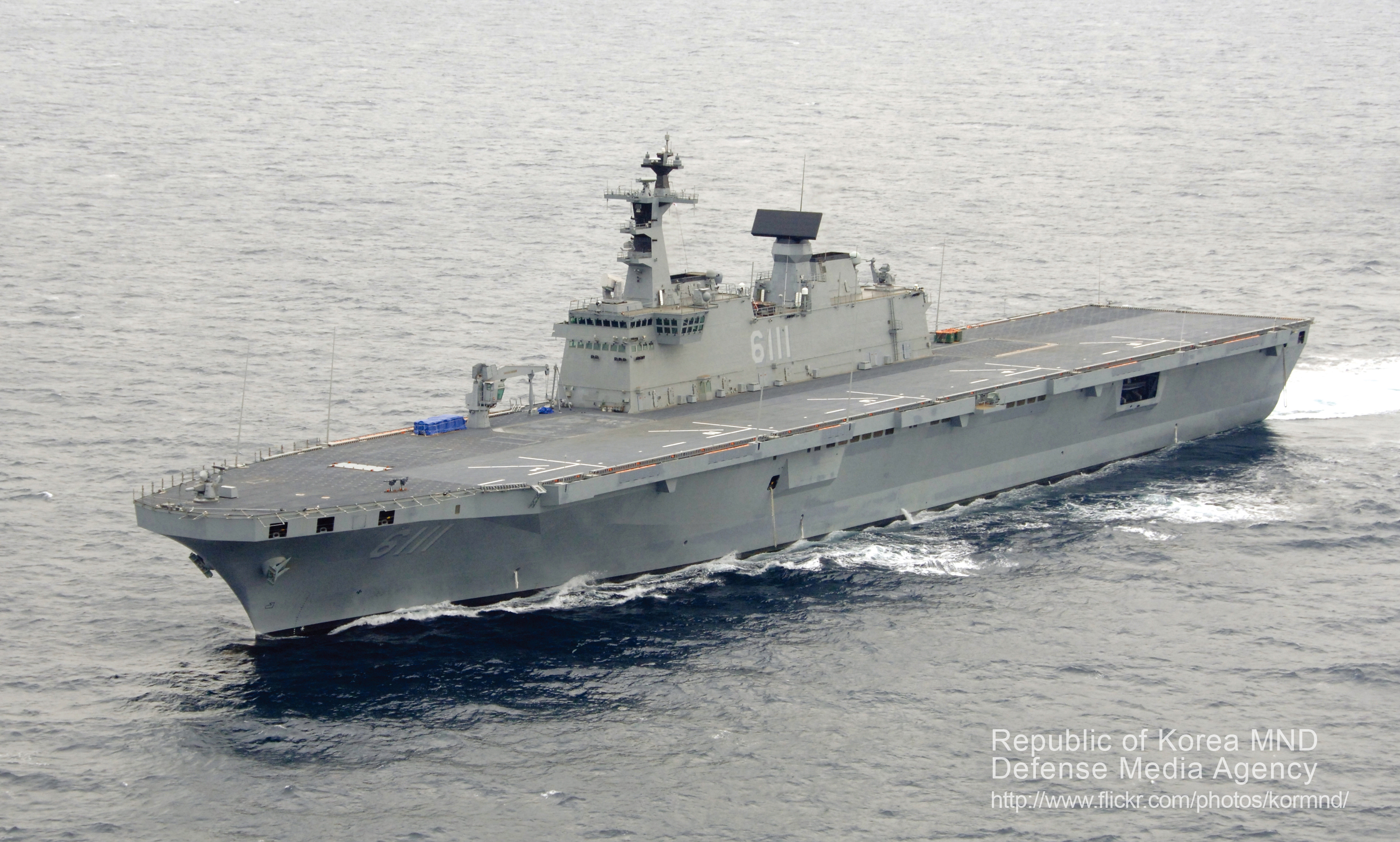
- ROKS Dokdo in 2010

History

South Korea
- Name: ROKS Dokdo
- Namesake: Dokdo
- Operator: Republic of Korea Navy
- Ordered: 28 October 2002
- Builder: Hanjin Heavy Industries & Constructions Co., Busan, South Korea
- Cost: $650 million
- Launched: 12 July 2005
- Completed: 2007
- Commissioned: 3 July 2007
- Status: Active

General characteristics
- Class & type: Dokdo-class amphibious assault ship
- Displacement: 14,300 tons empty; 18,800 tons full load
- Length: 199 m (652 ft 11 in)
- Beam: 31 m (101 ft 8 in)
- Draught: 7 m (23 ft 0 in)
- Propulsion: 4 SEMT Pielstick 16 PC2.5 STC diesel engines ~41,600 shp
- Speed: 23 knots (43 km/h; 26 mph) max; 18 knots (33 km/h; 21 mph) cruising
- Boats & landing craft carried: 2 LSF-II or LCAC
- Capacity: Up to 200 vehicles
- Troops: 720 marines, 6 tanks, 7 amphibious assault vehicles
- Crew: 330
- Sensors & processing systems: SMART-L air search radar, MW08 surface search radar, AN/SPS-95K navigation radar, TACAN, VAMPIR-MB optronic sight
- Electronic warfare & decoys: ESM/ECM:SLQ-200(v)5K SONATA, Chaff launcher
- Armament: Two Goalkeeper CIWS, One RIM-116 Rolling Airframe Missile
- Aircraft carried: Up to 15 helicopters (15 UH-60 Black Hawk or 10 SH-60F Ocean Hawk helicopters)

ROKS Dokdo (LPH-6111) is the lead ship of the Dokdo-class amphibious assault ship of the Republic of Korea Navy, launched on 12 July 2005 at the shipyard of Hanjin Heavy Industries & Constructions Co. in Busan. ROKS Dokdo was the flagship of the Fifth Component Flotilla of the Korean Navy until the launch of ROKS Marado in 2018. Previously, this title was held by the 9,000-ton at-sea Underway Replenishment (UNREP) support vessel ROKS Cheonji.

== Naming ==
The name Dokdo comes from the Korean name for the Liancourt Rocks, a group of islets in the Donghae that are currently administered by South Korea. The islets' ownership is disputed between Japan and South Korea. The Japanese Ministry of Foreign Affairs expressed its regret over the naming of Dokdo.

ROKS Dokdo was commissioned into the ROK Navy on 3 July 2007.

== History ==
In March 2010, Dokdo assisted in search and rescue operations after the sinking of ROKS Cheonan. In July, the ship took part in Operation Invincible Spirit, a joint alliance exercise.

In November 2024, the Republic of Korea Navy tested the Gray Eagle short take-off and landing UAV on ROKS Dokdo amphibious assault ship. The Gray Eagle UAV took off from Dokdo, flew twice close to her port side to perform a "simulated landing procedure", but did not land on the ship. It then headed to the Naval Air Command in Pohang and landed on the runway there.

== See also ==
- HTMS Chakri Naruebet
- Italian aircraft carrier Giuseppe Garibaldi
- Hyūga-class helicopter destroyer
- Project 23900 amphibious assault ship
