= Hahellaceae =

Scientific classification
- Domain: Bacteria
- Kingdom: Pseudomonadati
- Phylum: Pseudomonadota
- Class: Gammaproteobacteria
- Order: Oceanospirillales
- Family: Hahellaceae; Garrity et al. 2005

Genera
- Allohahella; Hahella; Halospina; Sansalvadorimonas; Thermohahella; Zooshikella

Family of bacteria

Hahellaceae is a family of Pseudomonadota bacteria in the order Oceanospirillales.
