= USS Miller =

Two ships of the United States Navy have borne the name USS Miller.

- USS Miller (DD-535), was a Fletcher-class destroyer, launched in 1943, renamed James Miller in 1973, and struck in 1974
- USS Miller (FF-1091), was a Knox-class frigate launched in 1973, reclassified in 1975, and struck in 1995.

== See also ==
- USS Doris Miller (CVN-81), a future Gerald R. Ford-class aircraft carrier
- USS Jack Miller (DE-410)
- USS William C. Miller (DE-259)
- USNS Sgt. Andrew Miller (T-AK-242)
