= List of aircraft carrier classes of the United States Navy =

On November 14, 1910, pilot Eugene Burton Ely took off in a Curtiss plane from the bow of Birmingham and later landed a Curtiss Model D on Pennsylvania on January 18, 1911. In fiscal year (FY) 1920, Congress approved a conversion of collier Jupiter into a ship designed for launching and recovering of airplanes at sea—the first aircraft carrier of the United States Navy. More aircraft carriers were approved and built, including Ranger, the first class of aircraft carriers in the United States Navy designed and built as aircraft carriers from the keel.

The United States declared war on Japan following the attack of December 7, 1941, on Pearl Harbor. The two nations revolutionized naval warfare in the course of the next four years; several of the most important sea battles were fought without either fleet coming within sight of the other. Most of the fleet carriers were built according to prewar designs, but the demand for air protection was so intense that two new classes were developed: light carriers (designated CVL), built on modified cruiser hulls, and escort carriers (CVE), whose main function was to protect Atlantic convoys from German U-boats.

During the postwar period, carrier technology made many advances. The angled flight deck was adopted in 1955. The first "supercarrier" was commissioned in 1955 (although an earlier plan had been canceled by the Secretary of Defense), and the first nuclear-powered carrier in 1961, all during the Cold War. Also, a record for crossing the Pacific Ocean was set by a U.S. Navy carrier during the Korean War. Carriers recovered spacecraft after splashdown, including the Mercury-Redstone 3 and Apollo 11 missions.

The lead ship of a new class, the Gerald R. Ford class, was launched in 2013 and was commissioned in 2017. The last conventionally powered (non-nuclear) US Navy carrier was decommissioned in 2007.

== Pre–World War II ==
On November 14, 1910, a 24‑year‑old civilian pilot, Eugene Burton Ely, took off in a 50 horsepower Curtiss plane from a wooden platform built over the bow of the cruiser Birmingham; later, on January 18, 1911, Ely landed a Curtiss Model D on a platform aboard Pennsylvania. The Naval Appropriations Act for Fiscal Year 1920 provided funds for the conversion of Jupiter into a ship designed for the launching and recovery of airplanes at sea—the United States Navy's first aircraft carrier. Renamed Langley, she was commissioned in 1922. Commander Kenneth Whiting was placed in command. In 1924, Langley reported for duty with the Battle Fleet, ending two years as an experimental ship.

In 1922, Congress also authorized the conversion of the unfinished battlecruisers Lexington and the Saratoga as permitted under the terms of the Washington Naval Treaty, signed in February 1922. The keel of Ranger, the first American ship designed and constructed as an aircraft carrier, was laid down in 1931, and the ship was commissioned in 1934.

Following Ranger and before the entry of the United States into World War II, four more carriers were commissioned. Wasp was essentially an improved version of Ranger. The others were the three ships of the Yorktown class.

Designation	Class	Ships	Active	Description	Lead Ship
CV-1	Langley	1	1922 – 1936	Converted from USS Jupiter. Experimental ship, served 1925–36 as an aircraft carrier before being converted to a seaplane tender and given the new hull symbol AV-3.	
CV-2	Lexington	2	1927 – 1946	The ships were laid down and partly built as part of a six-member battlecruiser class before being converted to carriers while under construction.	
CV-4	Ranger	1	1934 – 1946	First purpose-built US Navy aircraft carrier.	
CV-5	Yorktown	3	1937 – 1947	Hornet was built after Wasp. By the end of September 1942, both Yorktown and Hornet were on the bottom of the Pacific; USS Enterprise, the orphaned sister of the class, became a symbol of the Pacific War.	
CV-7	Wasp	1	1940 – 1942	Modified Yorktown class, built on 3,000 fewer tons to use up allotted tonnage under the Washington Naval Treaty.	

== World War II ==
The Imperial Japanese Navy struck Pearl Harbor on December 7, 1941, but none of the Pacific Fleet's aircraft carriers were in the harbor. Because a large fraction of the navy's battleship fleet was put out of commission by the attack, the undamaged aircraft carriers were forced to become the load-bearers of the early part of the war. The first aircraft carrier offensive of the U.S. Navy came on February 1, 1942, when the carriers Enterprise and Yorktown, attacked the Japanese bases in the Marshall and Gilbert Islands. The Battle of the Coral Sea became the first sea battle in history in which neither opposing fleet saw the other. The Battle of Midway started as a Japanese offensive on Midway Atoll met by an outnumbered U.S. carrier force, and resulted in a U.S. victory. The Battle of Midway was the turning point in the Pacific War.

In 1943, new designations for carriers were established, limiting the CV designation to USS Saratoga, USS Enterprise, and the Essex class. The new designations were CVB (Aircraft carrier, large) for the 45,000 long tons (46,000 t) carriers being built, and CVL (Aircraft carriers, small) for the 10,000 long tons (10,000 t) class built on light cruiser hulls. The same directive reclassified escort carriers as combatant ships, and changed their symbol from ACV to CVE. By the end of the war, the Navy had access to around 100 carriers of varying sizes.

On September 2, 1945, Japan signed the surrender agreement aboard USS Missouri, ending World War II.

Designation	Class	Ships	Active	Description	Lead Ship
CV-9	Essex	24	1942 – 1991	This class constituted the 20th century's largest class of heavy warships, with 24 ships built. 32 ships were originally ordered, but some were cancelled. (Some sources consider the 13 ships of the Ticonderoga class a separate class or "long hull" variants of the Essex class, and Oriskany a one-ship class).	
CVL-22	Independence	9	1943 – 1970	This class was a result of President Franklin Delano Roosevelt's interest in Navy shipbuilding plans. In August 1941, with war looming, he noted that no new fleet aircraft carriers were expected before 1944 and proposed to quickly convert some of the many cruisers then building.	

=== Training ships ===
During World War II, the United States Navy purchased two Great Lakes side-wheel paddle steamers and converted them into freshwater aircraft carrier training ships. Both vessels were designated with the hull classification symbol IX and lacked hangar decks, elevators or armaments. The role of these ships was for the training of pilots for carrier take-offs and landings. Together Sable and Wolverine trained 17,820 pilots in 116,000 carrier landings.

Designation	Class	Ships	Active	Description	Lead Ship
IX-64	Wolverine	1	1942–1945	Former Great Lakes paddle steamer Seeandbee converted for aircraft takeoff and landing training	
IX-81	Sable	1	1943–1945	Former Great Lakes paddle steamer Greater Buffalo converted for aircraft takeoff and landing training	

== Cold War ==
Aircraft carrier technology underwent many changes during the Cold War. The first of the 45,000-ton carriers, USS Midway was commissioned eight days after the end of World War II, on September 10. A larger ship was planned, and in 1948, President Harry Truman approved the construction of a "supercarrier", a 65,000-ton aircraft carrier to be named USS United States; however, the project was canceled in April 1949 by the Secretary of Defense. The Navy's first supercarriers came later, in 1955, with the Forrestal class. 1953 saw the first test of an angled-deck carrier, USS Antietam.

The "N" suffix was added to the designation system to represent nuclear powered carriers in 1956. The first carrier to receive this suffix was USS Enterprise, commissioned in 1961. The last conventionally powered carrier, USS John F. Kennedy, was commissioned in 1968 and was decommissioned in 2007.

The Korean War began June 25, 1950, and the need for planes and troops was urgent. Returning from Korea, USS Boxer made a record trip across the Pacific—7 days, 10 hours, and 36 minutes. In 1952, all carriers with designations "CV" or "CVB" were reclassified as attack carriers and given the sign "CVA".

As the Mercury-Redstone 3 mission ended, USS Lake Champlain recovered Commander Alan B. Shepard, the first American in space, on May 5, 1961. Another aircraft carrier USS Hornet, recovered the Apollo 11 astronauts after their splashdown. Apollo 11 was the first human landing mission to the moon, and was composed of astronauts Neil Armstrong, Buzz Aldrin, and Michael Collins.

In 1975, the first Nimitz-class aircraft carrier was commissioned; the Nimitz class were the largest warships in the world until the commissioning of their replacements, the Gerald R. Ford-class aircraft carriers. Construction and commissioning of the Nimitz class continued after the Cold War.

Also, in 1975, the U.S. Navy simplified the carrier designations—CV, CVA, CVAN, CVB, CVL—into CV for conventionally powered carriers and CVN for nuclear-powered carriers.

Designation	Class	Ships	Active	Description	Lead Ship
CV-41	Midway	3	1945 – 1992	This class was one of the longest lived carrier designs in history. First commissioned in late 1945, the lead ship of the class, USS Midway was not decommissioned until 1992, shortly after seeing service in the Gulf War. Six were planned; three were built including USS Coral Sea and USS Franklin D. Roosevelt. The class was originally designated CVB.	
CVL-48	Saipan	2	1946 – 1970	Built on modified Baltimore-class cruiser hulls. Both were converted to command-and-control ships in the mid-1950s: Saipan to USS Arlington (AGMR-2), Wright to CC-2.	
CVA-58	United States	1 keel	None commissioned	This class was never commissioned (3 more were planned). See Revolt of the Admirals for details.	
CV-59	Forrestal	4	1955 – 1998	The Forrestal class was the first class of "supercarriers" of the Navy, so called because of their then-extraordinarily high tonnage (75,000 tons, 25% larger than the Midway class), and full integration of the angled deck.	
CV-63	Kitty Hawk	3	1961 – 2009	Sometimes called "Improved Forrestal class". Sometimes mistaken as a four-ship class, with USS John F. Kennedy (see below) as a member. The biggest differences from the Forrestals are greater length, and a different placement of starboard elevators; two are forward of the island, with a third at the portside stern. This class includes USS America.	
CVN-65	Enterprise	1	1961 – 2012	First nuclear-powered aircraft carrier, using eight A2W reactors. Enlarged, modified, and nuclear-powered Kitty Hawk-class design. Six ships of this class were planned, only the lead ship was constructed. Enterprise had been in active operational service for 51 years, longer than any combatant ship in American history.	
CV-67	John F. Kennedy	1	1968 – 2007	Last conventionally powered aircraft carrier built (as of 2013). Sometimes grouped as a Kitty Hawk-class ship. Laid down as a nuclear ship to use four A3W reactors, converted to conventional propulsion early in construction.	
CVN-68	Nimitz	10	1975 – Present	A line of nuclear-powered supercarriers in service with the US Navy using two A4W reactors, and the largest capital ships in the world. The Nimitz class are numbered with consecutive hull numbers starting with CVN-68. Ten ships are in the class.	

== After the Cold War ==
When the Cold War ended in 1991, the U.S. Navy had conventionally powered carriers from the Midway, Forrestal, and Kitty Hawk classes active, along with USS John F. Kennedy; and the nuclear Nimitz class and USS Enterprise; however, all of the conventional carriers have been decommissioned. Construction of the Nimitz-class continued after the Cold War, and the last Nimitz-class carrier, USS George H. W. Bush, was commissioned in 2009.

The next class of supercarriers—the Gerald R. Ford class—launched the first ship in 2017. The new carriers will be stealthier, and feature A1B reactors, electromagnetic catapults, advanced arresting gear, reduced crew requirements, and a hull design based upon that of the Nimitz class. Ten carriers are planned for the Gerald R. Ford class.

Designation	Class	Ships	Active	Description	Lead ship
CVN-78	Gerald R. Ford	1 (9 more planned)	2017–present	The next generation supercarrier for the United States Navy. Carriers of the Gerald R. Ford class will incorporate many new design features including a new nuclear reactor design, stealthier features to help reduce radar profile, electromagnetic catapults, advanced arresting gear, and reduced crewing requirements. The Gerald R. Ford class uses the basic hull design of the preceding Nimitz class. Ten ships are currently planned for the Gerald R. Ford class.	

== Escort carriers ==
During World War II, the U.S. Navy built escort carriers in large numbers for patrol work, and scouting and escorting convoys. Escort carriers, based on merchant ship hulls, were smaller than aircraft carriers; escort carrier crews referred to the ships as "Jeep carriers", the press called them "baby flat tops". The escort carriers had lighter armor than aircraft carriers, were slower, had less defensive armament, and less aircraft capacity compared to aircraft carriers. This smaller variant of carriers was designated "CVE"; a common joke amongst crews was "CVE" meant "Combustible, Vulnerable and Expendable".

Early in the war, German submarines and aircraft were interfering with shipping. The worst losses occurred far at sea—out of the reach of land-based air forces—leading the Royal Navy to experiment with catapult-launching fighter aircraft from merchant ships, a somewhat successful approach. However, the number of planes was still limited, so the United Kingdom appealed to the United States for help.

Before World War II started, the U.S. Navy had contemplated converting merchant ships to small aircraft carriers for this purpose, so the quick solution was to build escort carriers on merchant ship hulls. The first escort carrier, USS Long Island, was converted from a freighter. A shortage of merchant ship hulls caused four escort carriers—USS Sangamon, USS Suwanee, USS Chenango, and USS Santee—to be built on oil tanker hulls. In total, 78 escort carriers were built and launched from June 1941 to April 1945.

Designation	Class	Ships	Description	Lead ship
CVE-1	Long Island	2	One ship, USS Long Island, in USN service, the other, HMS Archer, in the RN.	
CVE-9	Bogue	45	34 in RN service; 11 were Attacker class and 23 were Ruler class. The other 11 ships were in USN service.	
CVE-26	Sangamon	4	All in USN service. Built on oil tanker hulls rather than merchant ship hulls.	
CVE-30	Charger	4	One ship, USS Charger, mainly in USN service, the other three in RN service as the Avenger class.	
CVE-55	Casablanca	50	All in USN service.	
CVE-105	Commencement Bay	19	All in USN service. Includes two units which were accepted but not commissioned and laid up for many years after the war.	

== See also ==
- Aircraft carrier
- List of active French Navy ships
- List of active Italian Navy ships
- List of active Spanish Navy ships
- List of aircraft carriers
- List of aircraft carriers by configuration
- List of aircraft carriers in service
- List of aircraft carriers of Germany
- List of aircraft carriers of Russia and the Soviet Union
- List of aircraft carriers of the Royal Navy
- List of aircraft carriers of the United States Navy
- List of aircraft carriers of World War II
- List of amphibious warfare ships
- List of current ships of the Royal Canadian Navy
- List of escort carriers of the Royal Navy
- List of escort carriers of the United States Navy
- List of seaplane carriers of the Royal Navy
- List of ships of the Japanese Navy
- List of ships of the People's Liberation Army Navy § Aircraft carriers
- List of ships of World War II
- List of sunken aircraft carriers
- Ships of the Indian Navy
- Timeline for aircraft carrier service
