= USS William J. Clinton =

Planned Gerald R. Ford-class aircraft carrier

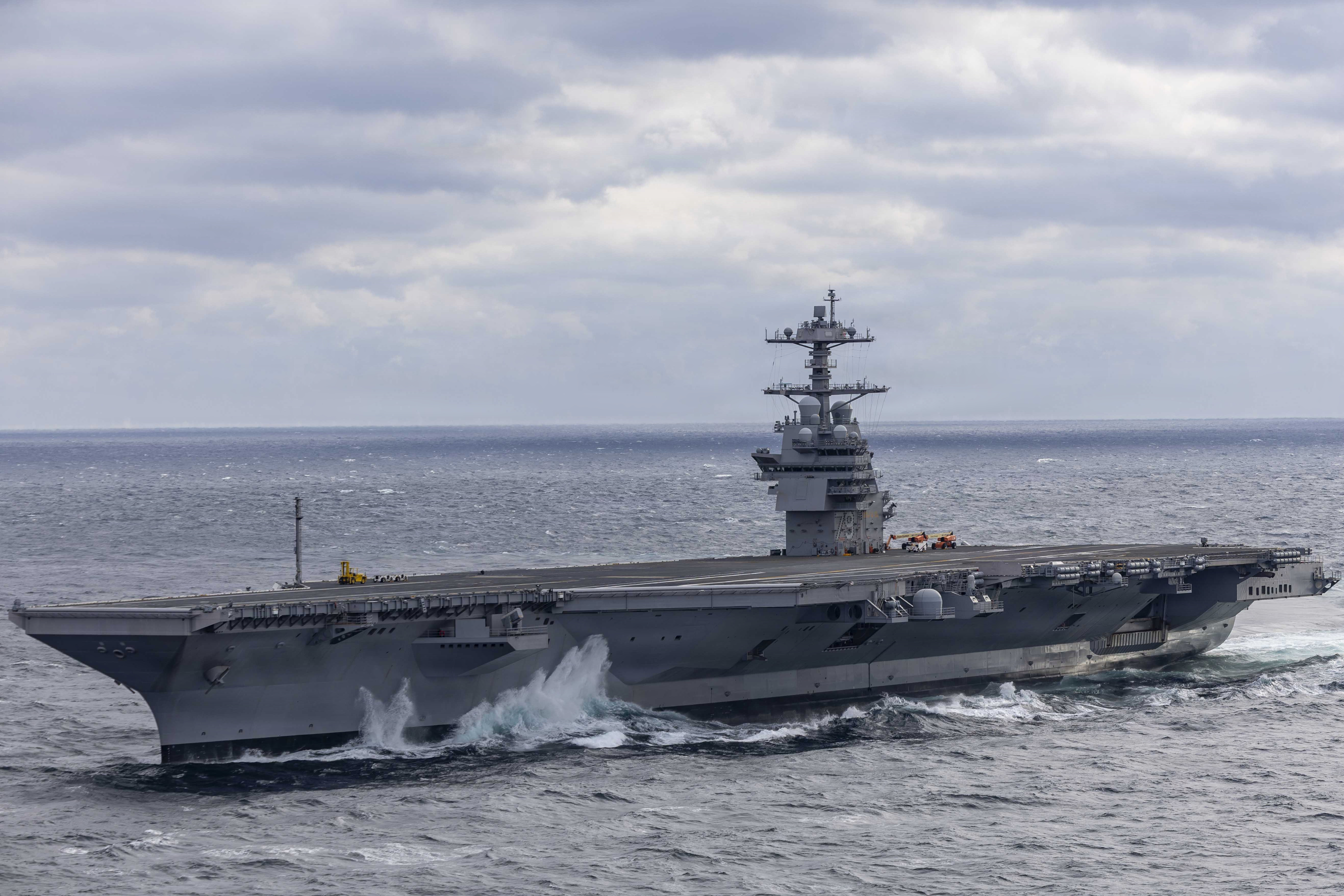
- Sister ship John F. Kennedy

History

United States
- Name: William J. Clinton
- Namesake: William J. Clinton
- Builder: Newport News Shipbuilding
- Laid down: 2027 (planned)
- Launched: 2032 (planned)
- Commissioned: 2036 (planned)
- Identification: CVN-82
- Status: Planned

General characteristics
- Class & type: Gerald R. Ford-class aircraft carrier
- Displacement: About 100,000 long tons (100,000 tonnes) (full load)
- Length: 1,106 ft (337 m)
- Beam: 134 ft (41 m)
- Draft: 39 ft (12 m)
- Installed power: Two A1B nuclear reactors
- Propulsion: Four shafts
- Speed: In excess of 30 knots (56 km/h; 35 mph)
- Range: Unlimited distance; 20–25 years
- Complement: 4,660
- Armament: Surface-to-air missiles; Close-in weapons systems
- Aircraft carried: More than 80, approx. up to 90 combat aircraft
- Aviation facilities: 1,092 ft × 256 ft (333 m × 78 m) flight deck

USS William J. Clinton (CVN-82) is planned to be the fifth Gerald R. Ford-class aircraft carrier of the United States Navy. William J. Clinton is scheduled to be laid down in 2027, launched in 2032 and commissioned by 2036. She will be built at Newport News Shipbuilding in Newport News, Virginia.

== Naming ==
The ship's name was announced on 13 January 2025 in a press release by President Joe Biden together with the name of the future CVN-83. She will be named for the 42nd president of the United States, Bill Clinton.

== See also ==
- List of aircraft carriers of the United States Navy
