= USS John F. Kennedy =

USS John F. Kennedy may refer to:

- USS John F. Kennedy (CV-67), an aircraft carrier in commission from 1968 to 2007
- USS John F. Kennedy (CVN-79), a Gerald R. Ford-class aircraft carrier launched in 2019

== See also ==
- USS Kennedy
- MV John F. Kennedy
