= USS George W. Bush =

Planned Gerald R. Ford-class aircraft carrier

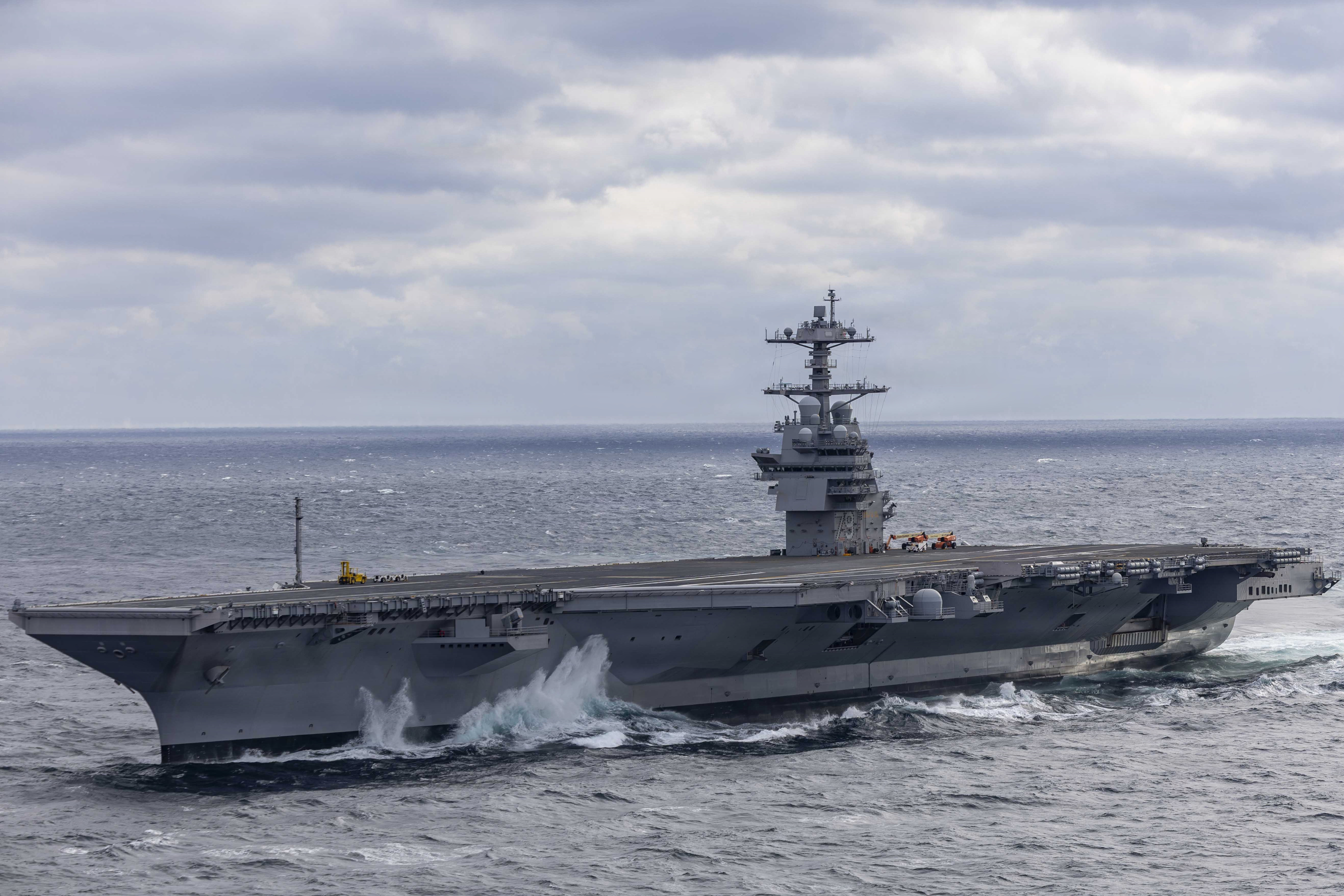
- Sister ship John F. Kennedy

History

United States
- Name: George W. Bush
- Namesake: George W. Bush
- Builder: Newport News Shipbuilding
- Identification: CVN-83
- Status: Planned

General characteristics
- Class & type: Gerald R. Ford-class aircraft carrier
- Displacement: About 100,000 long tons (100,000 tonnes) (full load)
- Length: 1,106 ft (337 m)
- Beam: 134 ft (41 m)
- Draft: 39 ft (12 m)
- Installed power: Two A1B nuclear reactors
- Propulsion: Four shafts
- Speed: In excess of 30 knots (56 km/h; 35 mph)
- Range: Unlimited distance; 20–25 years
- Complement: 4,660
- Armament: Surface-to-air missiles; Close-in weapons systems
- Aircraft carried: More than 80, approx. up to 90 combat aircraft
- Aviation facilities: 1,092 ft × 256 ft (333 m × 78 m) flight deck

USS George W. Bush (CVN-83) is planned to be the sixth Gerald R. Ford-class aircraft carrier of the United States Navy. George W. Bush is scheduled to be laid down after 2027. She will be built at Newport News Shipbuilding in Newport News, Virginia.

== Naming ==
The ship's name was announced on 13 January 2025 in a press release by President Joe Biden, together with the name of CVN-82. She will be named for the 43rd president of the United States, George W. Bush. (Note: The Nimitz-class aircraft carrier USS George H. W. Bush (CVN-77) bears the name of George W. Bush's father and 41st President of the United States George H. W. Bush.)

== See also ==
- List of aircraft carriers of the United States Navy
