= USS Doris Miller =

Planned Gerald R. Ford-class aircraft carrier

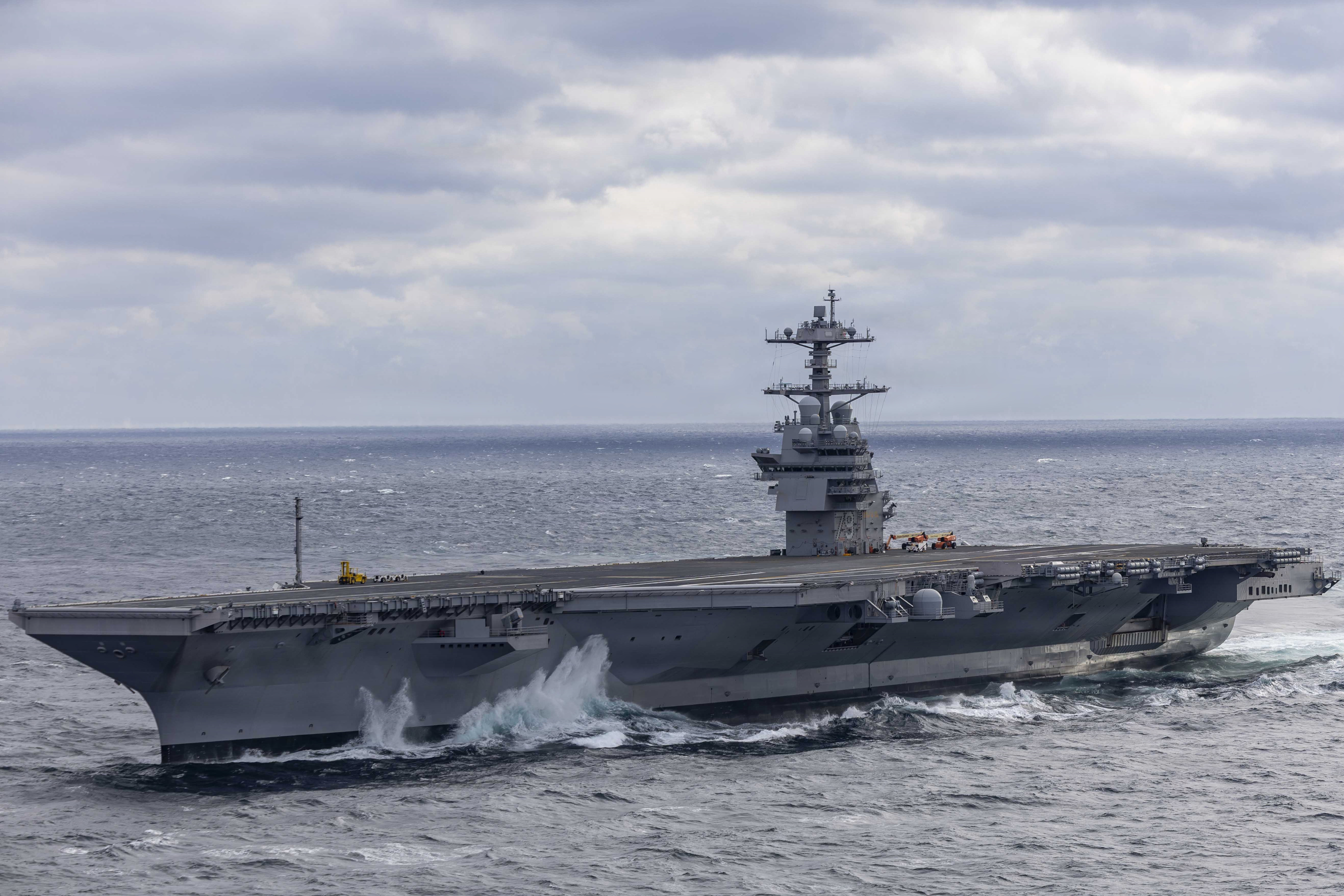
- Sister ship John F. Kennedy

History

United States
- Name: Doris Miller
- Namesake: Doris Miller
- Awarded: 31 January 2019
- Builder: Newport News Shipbuilding
- Laid down: 5 December 2026 (expected)
- Launched: October 2029 (planned)
- Sponsored by: Charlene Austin; Taya Miller
- Commissioned: 2034 (planned)
- Identification: CVN-81
- Status: Under construction

General characteristics
- Class & type: Gerald R. Ford-class aircraft carrier
- Displacement: About 100,000 long tons (100,000 tonnes) (full load)
- Length: 1,106 ft (337 m)
- Beam: 134 ft (41 m)
- Draft: 39 ft (12 m)
- Installed power: Two A1B nuclear reactors
- Propulsion: Four shafts
- Speed: In excess of 30 knots (56 km/h; 35 mph)
- Range: Unlimited distance; 20–25 years
- Complement: 4,660
- Armament: Surface-to-air missiles; Close-in weapons systems
- Aircraft carried: 80 to 90 combat aircraft
- Aviation facilities: 1,092 ft × 256 ft (333 m × 78 m) flight deck

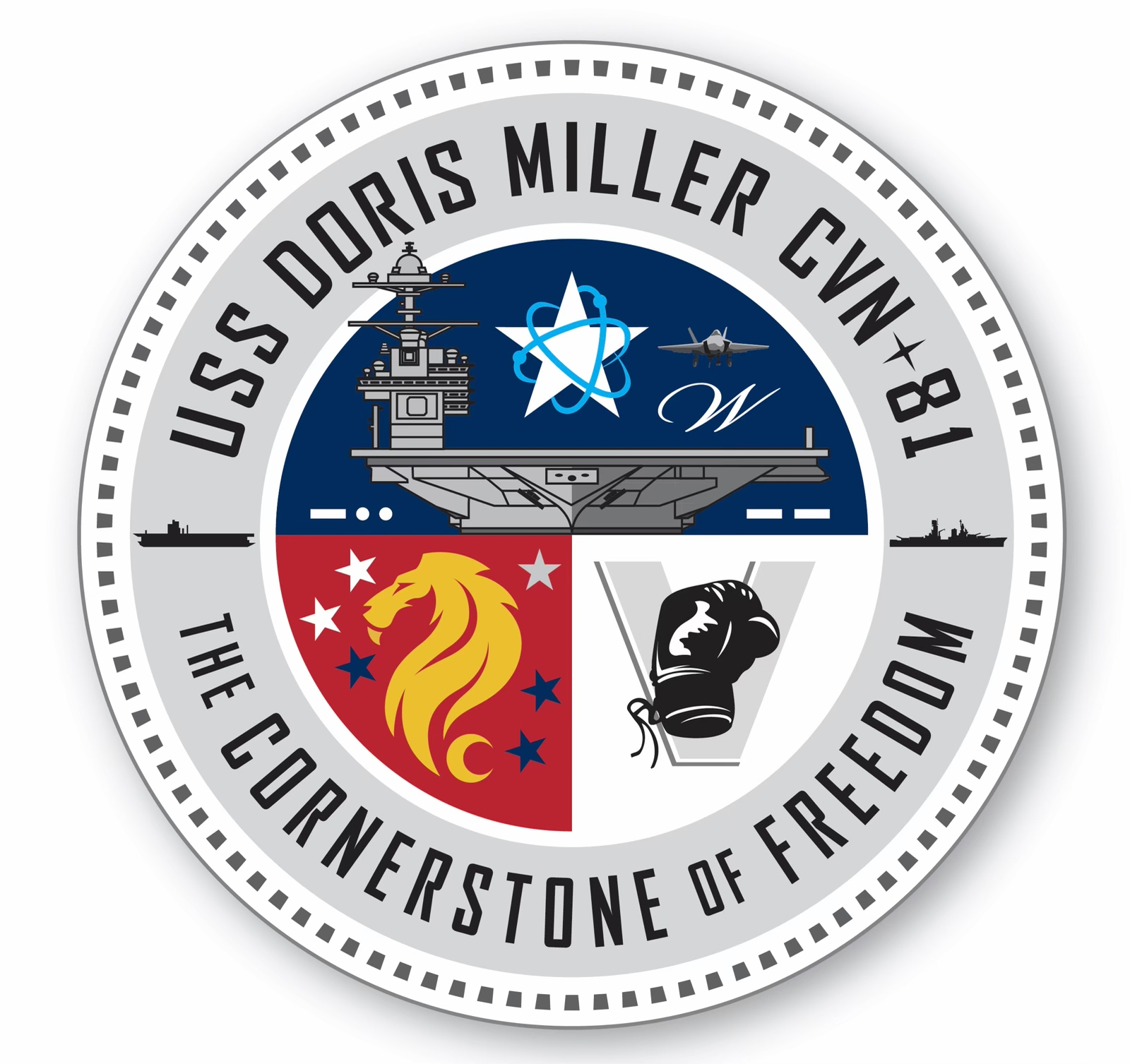
USS Doris Miller crest designed by the USS Nevada Remembrance Project

USS Doris Miller (CVN-81) is planned to be the fourth Gerald R. Ford-class aircraft carrier of the United States Navy. Doris Miller is expected to be laid down in 2026, and commissioned in February 2034. She will be built at Newport News Shipbuilding, a division of Huntington Ingalls Industries (formerly Northrop Grumman Shipbuilding) in Newport News, Virginia.

== Naming ==
The ship, named for Messman Second Class Doris Miller, marks two historic firsts as the first aircraft carrier named for an enlisted sailor, as well as the first named for an African American. The ship will be the second to honor Miller, who received the Navy Cross for his actions during the attack on Pearl Harbor; the first ship was USS Miller (FF-1091).

In August 2026, acting Secretary of the Navy Hung Cao and the Trump administration were investigating changing the ship's name from Doris Miller. A number of official publications, including the National Security Memorandum that directed the replacement of the ship's electromagnetic catapults with steam catapults, made no reference to the ship's name, instead referring to it as CVN-81. This led to further speculation that there would be an attempt to rename the ship, potentially after Donald Trump. Were this to take place, it would be the first instance of a US Navy aircraft carrier named after a sitting president. Cao's spokesperson said on November 20, 2026 that the Navy had no plans to rename the ship.

== Construction ==
On 25 August 2021, with six members of Doris Miller's family in attendance, the Navy conducted the First Cut of Steel ceremony at Newport News Shipbuilding, signaling the formal start of construction for the fourth Ford-class aircraft carrier.

Doris Miller was scheduled to be laid down January 2026, launched October 2029, and commissioned in February 2032, but construction was delayed due to delays in the prior ship of the class, USS Enterprise (CVN-80).

In August 2026, President Donald Trump sent a memo to the acting Secretary of the Navy Hung Cao instructing him to develop a plan regarding measures required to remove the Electromagnetic Aircraft Launch System (EMALS), as well as the electromagnetic weapons elevators. General Atomics, who supplies the EMALS, stated that this change would "introduce significant cost, schedule and integration risks."

== See also ==
- List of aircraft carriers of the United States Navy
