= USS Kennedy =

USS Kennedy may refer to the following ships of the United States Navy:

- Named for John Pendleton Kennedy (1795–1870)
  - USS John P. Kennedy (1853) was a supply ship purchased by the US Navy in 1853 and sold in November 1855
  - USS Kennedy (DD-306) was a Clemson-class destroyer launched 15 February 1919 and scrapped in 1931
- Named for Joseph Patrick Kennedy, Jr. (1915–1944)
  - USS Joseph P. Kennedy Jr. (DD-850) was a Gearing-class destroyer launched 26 July 1945, decommissioned in 1973 and preserved as a museum ship
- Named for John Fitzgerald Kennedy (1917–1963)
  - USS John F. Kennedy (CV-67), an aircraft carrier in commission from 1968 to 2007
  - USS John F. Kennedy (CVN-79), a Gerald R. Ford-class aircraft carrier currently fitting out
- Named for Robert F. Kennedy (1925–1968)
  - USNS Robert F. Kennedy (T-AO-208), a John Lewis-class replenishment oiler currently in service
