= A3W reactor =

Naval reactor

The A3W reactor was a naval reactor used by the United States Navy to provide electricity generation and propulsion on warships. Like all operational U.S. naval reactors it was a pressurized water reactor (PWR) design. The A3W designation stands for:

- A = Aircraft carrier platform.
- 3 = Third generation core designed by the contractor.
- W = Westinghouse was the contracted designer.

== History ==
The reactor was intended for use aboard USS John F. Kennedy. This four-reactor design was intended to reduce the cost involved in the construction and operation, as compared with the Enterprise and its eight nuclear reactors.

Early in the construction, the United States Secretary of the Navy had the plans changed to save money, and fossil fuel boilers were installed on the Kennedy. Because the plans for the ship did not include a funnel, the funnel on the Kennedy protrudes out from the ship at an angle.

The return to nuclear power for carriers came with the Nimitz class's A4W reactor's two reactor per ship design. While the two reactor configuration, with each core providing a much greater thermal output, is relatively less expensive than earlier designs, the power plant still represents about half the total cost of the ship.

== See also ==
- List of United States naval reactors
