= Gerald R. Ford-class aircraft carrier =

Class of supercarriers for the U.S. Navy

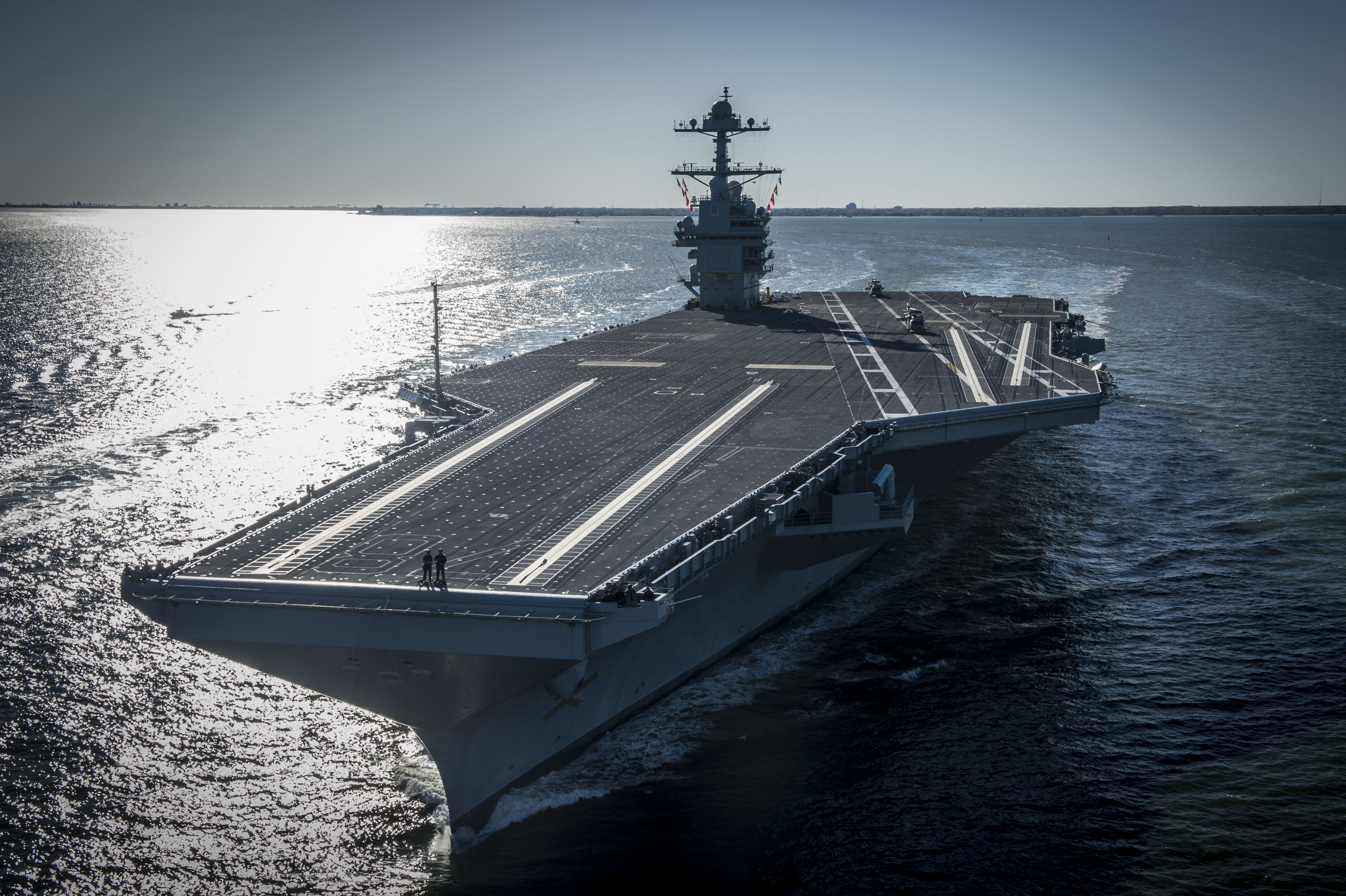
- USS Gerald R. Ford underway in April 2017

Class overview
- Name: Gerald R. Ford-class aircraft carrier
- Builders: Newport News Shipbuilding
- Operators: United States Navy
- Preceded by: Nimitz class
- Cost: Program cost: US$37.30 billion (FY2018); Unit cost: US$12.998 billion (FY2018)
- Built: 2009–present
- In service: 2017–present
- Planned: 10
- On order: 2
- Building: 1
- Completed: 2
- Active: 1

General characteristics
- Type: Aircraft carrier
- Displacement: About 100,000 long tons (100,000 tonnes) (full load)
- Length: 1,092 ft (333 m) – 1,106 ft (337 m)
- Beam: 256 ft (78 m) (flight deck); 134 ft (41 m) (waterline)
- Height: 250 feet (76 m)
- Draft: 39 ft (12 m)
- Decks: 25
- Installed power: Two Bechtel A1B PWR nuclear reactors, HEU 93.5%
- Propulsion: Four shafts
- Speed: In excess of 30 knots (56 km/h; 35 mph)
- Range: Unlimited
- Endurance: 50-year service life
- Complement: 508 officers; 3,789 enlisted
- Crew: About 2,600
- Sensors & processing systems: AN/SPY-3 Multi-Function Radar (MFR) X band active electronically scanned array (CVN-78); AN/SPY-4 Volume Search Radar (VSR) S band active electronically scanned array (CVN-78); AN/SPY-6(V)3 Enterprise Air Surveillance Radar (EASR) S band active electronically scanned array (CVN-79 and up); AN/SPQ-9B X band surface search radar (CVN-79 and up)
- Electronic warfare & decoys: AN/SLQ-32(V)6 electronic warfare system; AN/SLQ-25C Nixie towed torpedo decoys
- Armament: Surface-to-air missiles: 2 × Mk 29 Guided Missile Launching Systems, 8 × RIM-162 Evolved SeaSparrow Missile (ESSM) each; 2 × Mk 49 Guided Missile Launching Systems, 21 × RIM-116 Rolling Airframe Missiles each; Guns: 3 × Phalanx CIWS; 4 × Mk 38 25 mm Machine Gun Systems; 4 × M2 .50 cal. (12.7 mm) machine guns
- Aircraft carried: 75+
- Aviation facilities: 1,092 ft × 252 ft (333 m × 77 m) flight deck

The Gerald R. Ford-class aircraft carrier is a class of nuclear-powered aircraft carriers built for the United States Navy to replace portions of the aging Nimitz-class carrier fleet. Named after former U.S. president Gerald R. Ford, the class is designed to provide upgraded weapons systems, improved energy efficiency, reduced operating costs, and reduced crew requirements. Key changes include the Electromagnetic Aircraft Launch System (EMALS), Advanced Arresting Gear (AAG), and a redesigned flight deck. The lead ship, USS Gerald R. Ford, was commissioned in 2017 with the second ship of the class, USS John F. Kennedy, expected to be delivered in 2027.

== Design features ==
Carriers of the Gerald R. Ford class have:

- Advanced Arresting Gear.
- Automation, allowing a crew of several hundred fewer than the Nimitz-class carrier.
- The updated RIM-162 Evolved SeaSparrow Missile.
- An AN/SPY-3 X Band multifunction radar and an AN/SPY-4 S Band volume search radar on the lead ship. Designated together as Dual Band Radar (DBR), initially developed for the Zumwalt-class destroyers. Starting with the second ship, John F. Kennedy (CVN-79), DBR is replaced with AN/SPY-6(V)3 S band multifunction radar and an AN/SPQ-9B X band surface search radar.
- An Electromagnetic Aircraft Launch System (EMALS) in place of traditional steam catapults for launching aircraft.
- A new nuclear reactor design (the A1B reactor) for greater power generation.
- Stealth features to reduce radar cross-section.
- The ability to carry up to 90 aircraft, including the Boeing F/A-18E/F Super Hornet, Boeing EA-18G Growler, Grumman C-2 Greyhound, Northrop Grumman E-2 Hawkeye, Lockheed Martin F-35C Lightning II, Sikorsky SH-60 Seahawk helicopters, Bell-Boeing V-22 Osprey tiltrotors, unmanned combat aerial vehicles, and the future Boeing F/A-XX.

The biggest visible difference from earlier supercarriers is the more aft location of the island (superstructure). The Gerald R. Ford-class carriers will have a reduced whole-life cost due in part to reduced crew size. These ships are intended to sustain 160 sorties per day for 30-plus days, with a surge capability of 270 sorties per day. Director of Operational Testing Michael Gilmore has criticized the assumptions used in these forecasts as unrealistic and has indicated sortie rates similar to the 120/240 per day of the Nimitz class would be acceptable.

== Development ==
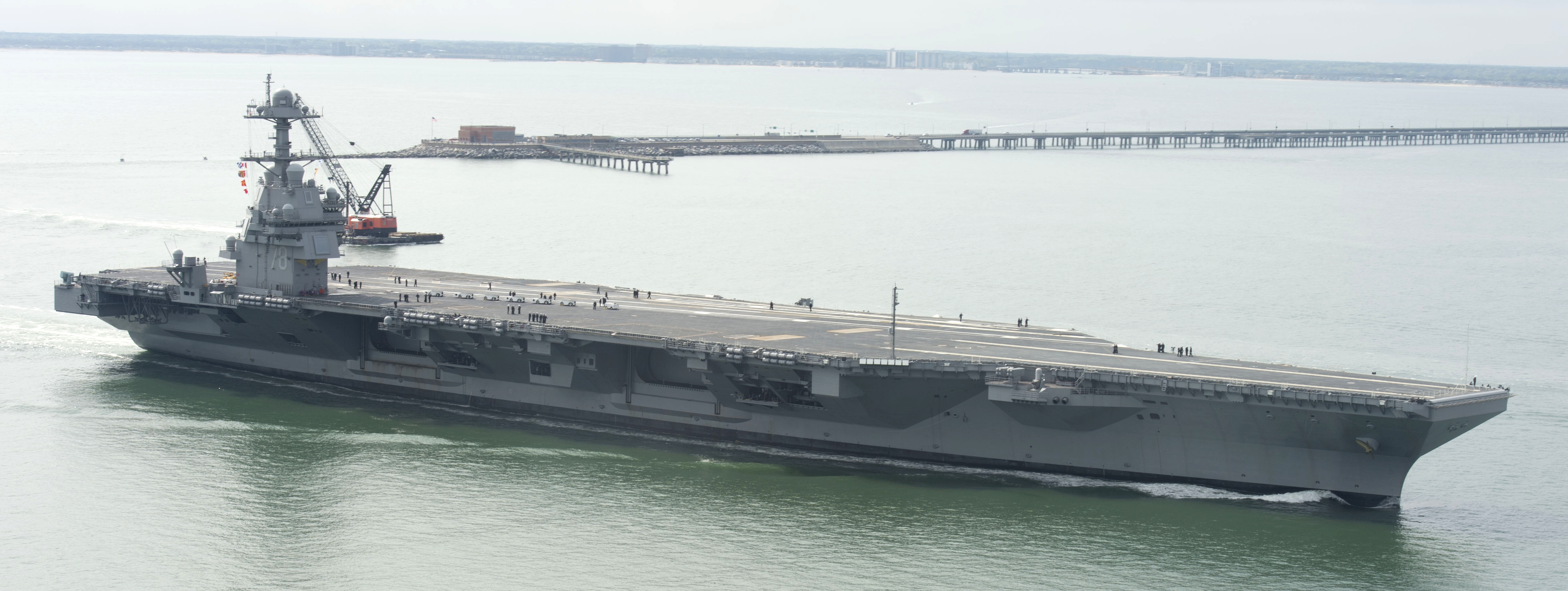
Gerald R. Ford arrived at Naval Station Norfolk after seven days of builders trials in April 2017.

The Nimitz-class aircraft carriers in US naval service have been part of United States power projection strategy since Nimitz was commissioned in 1975. The design has accommodated many new technologies over the decades, but it has limited ability to support the most recent technical advances. As a 2005 RAND report said, "The biggest problems facing the Nimitz class are the limited electrical power generation capability and the upgrade-driven increase in ship weight and erosion of the center-of-gravity margin needed to maintain ship stability."

With these constraints in mind, the US Navy developed what was initially known as the CVN-21 program, which evolved into CVN-78, Gerald R. Ford. Improvements were made through developing technologies and more efficient design. Major design changes include a larger flight deck, improvements in weapons and material handling, a new propulsion plant design that requires fewer people to operate and maintain, and a new, smaller island that has been pushed aft. Technological advances in electromagnetics have led to the development of an Electromagnetic Aircraft Launch System (EMALS) and an Advanced Arresting Gear (AAG). An integrated warfare system, the Ship Self-Defense System (SSDS), has been developed to allow the ship to more easily take on new missions. The new Dual Band Radar (DBR) combines S-band and X-band radar.

These advances are intended to allow Ford-class carriers to launch 25% more sorties, generate triple the electrical power with improved efficiency, and offer crew quality-of-life improvements over the Nimitz design.

=== Flight deck ===
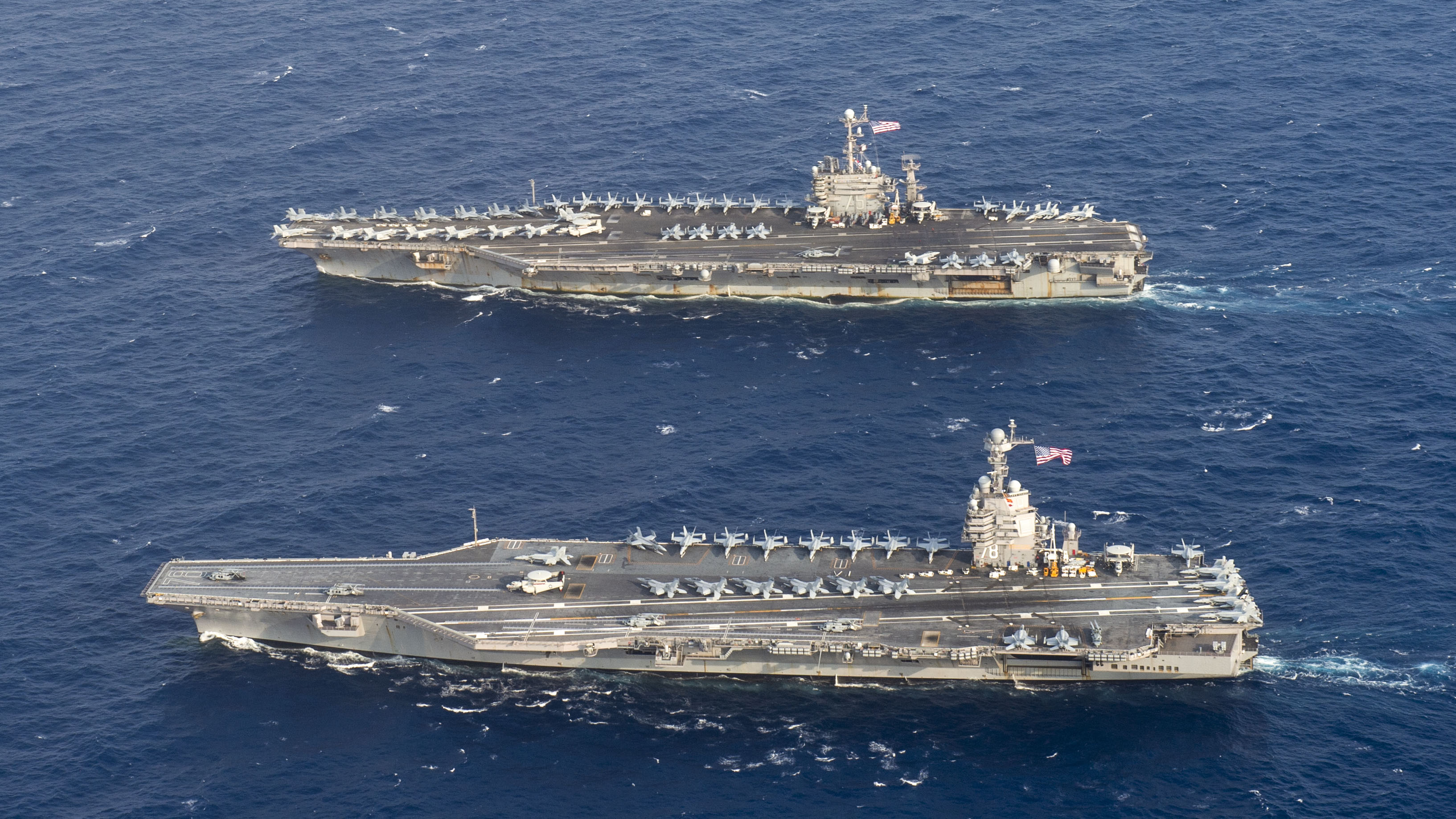
Aerial view of Gerald R. Ford (CVN-78, bottom) alongside USS Harry S. Truman (CVN-75, top), a ship of the preceding Nimitz class

The movement of weapons from storage and assembly to the aircraft on the flight deck has also been streamlined and accelerated. Ordnance will be lifted to the centralized rearming location via higher-capacity weapons elevators that use linear motors. These elevators are located so that ordnance need not cross any areas of aircraft movement, thereby reducing traffic problems in the hangars and on the flight deck. In 2008, Rear Admiral Dennis M. Dwyer said these changes will make it hypothetically possible to rearm the airplanes in "minutes instead of hours".

=== Power generation ===
The Bechtel A1B reactor for the Gerald R. Ford class is smaller and simpler, requires fewer crew, and yet is far more powerful than the Nimitz-class A4W reactor. Two reactors will be installed on each Gerald R. Ford-class carrier, providing a power generation capacity at least 25% greater than the 550 MW (thermal) of the two A4W reactors in a Nimitz-class carrier. The portion of thermal power allotted to electrical generation will be tripled.

The propulsion and power plant of the Nimitz-class carriers were designed in the 1960s, when onboard technologies required less electrical power. "New technologies added to the Nimitz-class ships have generated increased demands for electricity; the current base load leaves little margin to meet expanding demands for power."

The Gerald R. Ford-class ships convert steam into power by piping it to four main turbine generators (MTG) to generate electricity for major ship systems, and the new electromagnetic catapults. The Gerald R. Ford-class ships use steam turbines for propulsion.

A larger power output is a major component of the integrated warfare system. Engineers took extra steps to ensure that integrating unforeseen technological advances onto a Gerald R. Ford-class aircraft carrier would be possible. The Navy expects the Gerald R. Ford class will be part of the fleet for 90 years, until the year 2105, which means that the class must successfully accept new technology over the decades. Only half of the electric power generation capacity is used by currently planned systems, with half remaining available for future technologies.

=== Electromagnetic Aircraft Launch System ===
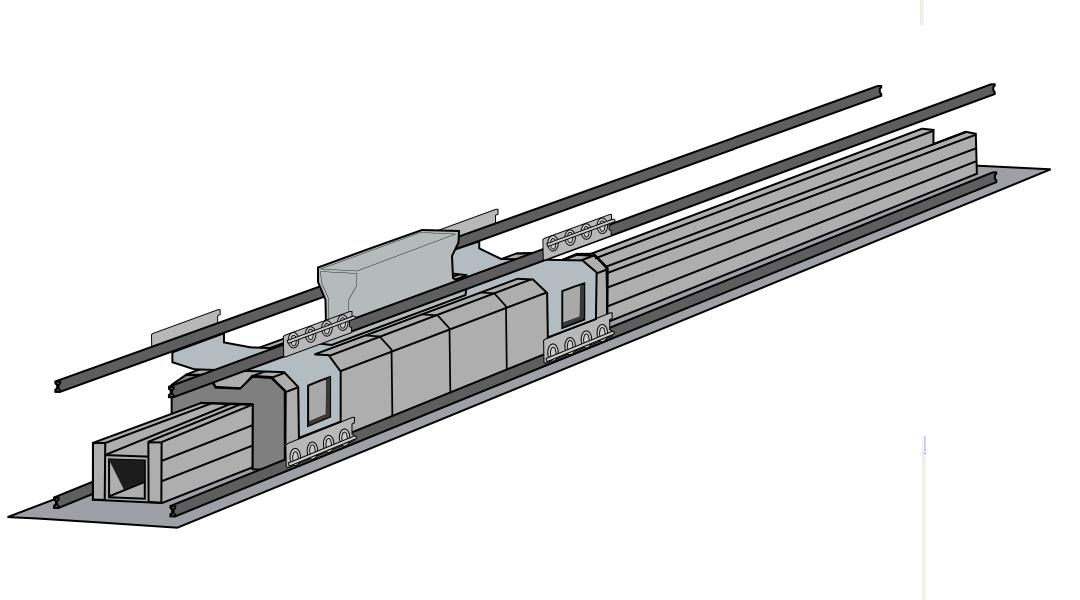
A drawing of the EMALS's linear induction motor

The Electromagnetic Aircraft Launch System (EMALS) launches aircraft by means of a catapult employing a linear induction motor rather than the steam piston used on the Nimitz class. The EMALS accelerates aircraft more smoothly, putting less stress on their airframes. The EMALS also weighs less, is expected to cost less and require less maintenance, and can launch both heavier and lighter aircraft than a steam piston-driven system. It also reduces the carrier's requirement for fresh water, thus reducing the demand for energy-intensive desalination.

In a memo from August 2026 that was sent directly to the acting Secretary of the Navy Hung Cao, President Donald Trump called for the removal of the EMALS from all future ships in the class, starting with the USS Doris Miller. During a hearing for Cao's nomination on November 17, Senator Roger Wicker said, "returning to steam is a nonstarter". The day before, Republicans on the Senate Appropriations Committee had expressed support for EMALS.

=== Advanced Arresting Gear landing system ===
Electromagnets are used in the Advanced Arresting Gear (AAG) system. The energy absorption is controlled by a turbo-electric engine. This makes the trap smooth and reduces shock on airframes.

=== Sensors and self-defense systems ===
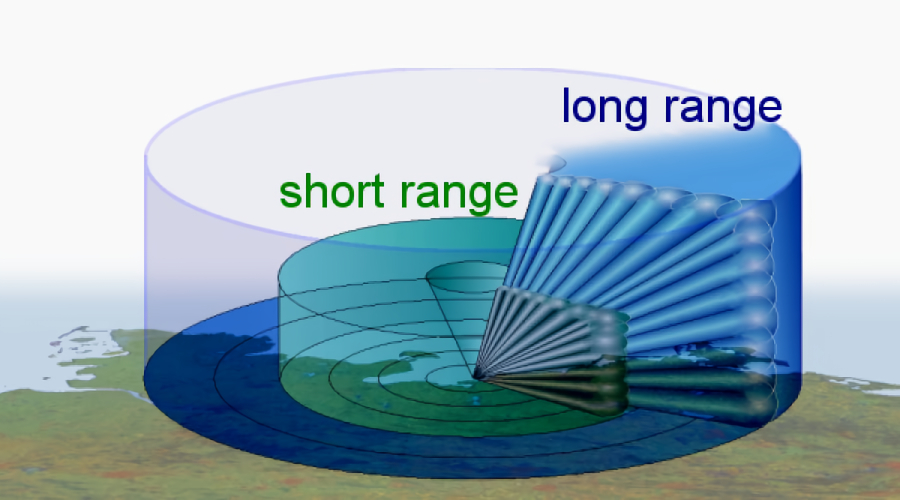
Diagram of AN/SPY-3 vertical electronic pencil beam radar conex projections

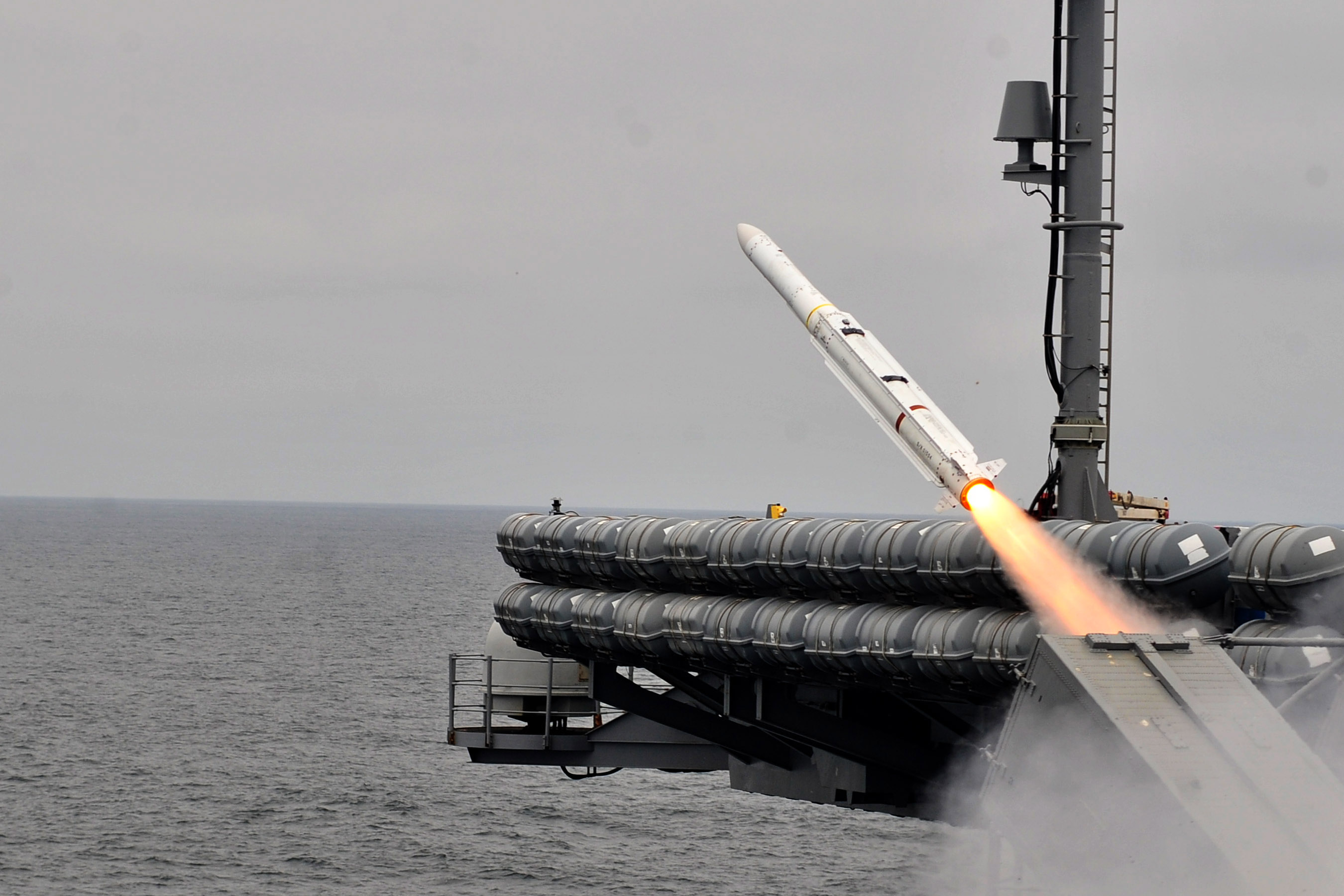
An Evolved SeaSparrow Missile launching

Another addition to the Gerald R. Ford class is an integrated active electronically scanned array search and tracking radar system. The dual-band radar (DBR) was being developed by Raytheon, for both the Zumwalt-class guided missile destroyers and the Gerald R. Ford-class aircraft carriers. The island can be kept smaller by replacing six to ten radar antennas with a single six-faced radar. The DBR works by combining the X band AN/SPY-3 multifunction radar with the S band AN/SPY-4 Volume Search Radar (VSR) emitters, distributed into three phased arrays. The S-band radar was later deleted from the Zumwalt-class destroyers to save money.

The three faces dedicated to the X-band radar handle low-altitude tracking and radar illumination, while the three S-band faces handle target search and tracking regardless of weather. "Operating simultaneously over two electromagnetic frequency ranges, the DBR marks the first time this functionality has been achieved using two frequencies coordinated by a single resource manager."

This system has no moving parts, therefore minimizing maintenance and manning requirements for operation. The AN/SPY-3 consists of three active arrays and the Receiver/Exciter (REX) cabinets above-decks and the Signal and Data Processor (SDP) subsystem below-decks. The VSR has a similar architecture, with the beamforming and narrowband down-conversion functionality occurring in two additional cabinets per array. A central controller (the resource manager) resides in the Data Processor (DP). The DBR is the first radar system that uses a central controller and two active-array radars operating at different frequencies. The DBR gets its power from the Common Array Power System (CAPS), which comprises Power Conversion Units (PCUs) and Power Distribution Units (PDUs). The DBR is cooled via a closed-loop cooling system called the Common Array Cooling System (CACS).

Driven by a need for a lower-cost radar system, the Navy installed the AN/SPY-6(V)3 Enterprise Air Surveillance Radar (EASR) starting with the second Gerald R. Ford-class aircraft carrier, John F. Kennedy (CVN-79), in lieu of the DBR. The EASR suite's initial per-unit cost of about $180 million was less than the DBR, which was about $500 million. The AN/SPQ-9B complements the AN/SPY-6(V)3 EASR.

=== Possible upgrades ===
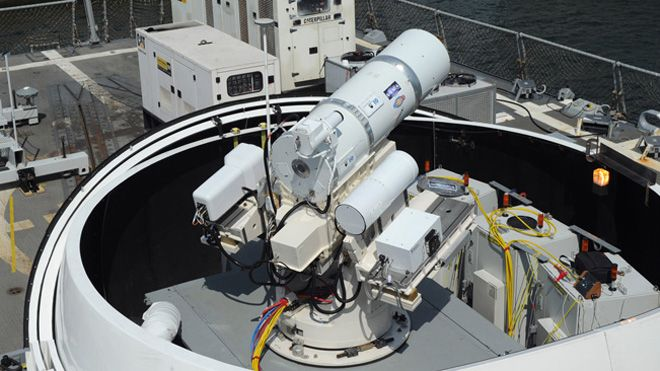
AN/SEQ-3 laser prototype during an on-board test

Future defense systems, such as free-electron laser directed-energy weapons, electric armor, and tracking systems will require more power. "Only half of the electrical power-generation capability on CVN-78 is needed to run currently planned systems, including EMALS. CVN-78 will thus have the power reserves that the Nimitz class lacks to run lasers and electric armor." The addition of new technologies, power systems, design layout, and better control systems results in an increased sortie rate of 25% over the Nimitz class and a 25% reduction in manpower required to operate.

New waste management technology will be deployed on Gerald R. Ford. Co-developed with the Carderock Division of the Naval Surface Warfare Center, PyroGenesis Canada Inc. was in 2008 awarded the contract to outfit the ship with a Plasma Arc Waste Destruction System (PAWDS). This compact system will treat all combustible solid waste generated on board the ship. After having completed factory acceptance testing in Montreal, the system was scheduled to be shipped to the Huntington Ingalls shipyard in late 2011 for installation on the carrier.

The Navy is developing a free-electron laser (FEL) to defend against cruise missiles and small-boat swarms.

=== 3D computer-aided design ===
Newport News Shipbuilding used a full-scale three-dimensional product model developed in Dassault Systèmes CATIA V5 to design and plan the construction of the Gerald R. Ford class of aircraft carriers.

The CVN 78 class was designed to have better weapons movement paths, largely eliminating horizontal movements within the ship. Current plans call for advanced weapons elevators to move from storage areas to dedicated weapons handling areas. Sailors would use motorized carts to move the weapons from storage to the elevators at different levels of the weapons magazines. Linear motors are being considered for the advanced weapons elevators. The elevators will also be relocated such that they will not impede aircraft operations on the flight deck. The redesign of the weapons movement paths and the location of the weapons elevators on the flight deck will reduce manpower and contribute to a much higher sortie generation rate.

=== Crew accommodations ===
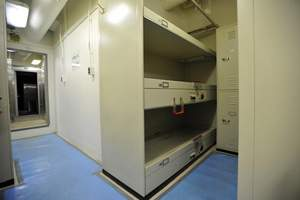
A typical berthing on Gerald R. Ford-class aircraft carriers of three racks per section

Systems that reduce crew workload have allowed the ship's company on Gerald R. Ford-class carriers to total only 2,600 sailors, about 700 fewer than a Nimitz-class carrier. The massive, 180-man berthing areas on the Nimitz class are replaced by 40-rack berthing areas on Gerald R. Ford-class carriers. The smaller berthings are quieter and the layout requires less foot traffic through other spaces. Typically the racks are stacked three high, with locker space per person. The berthings do not feature modern "sit-up" racks with more headroom; bottom and middle racks only accommodate a sailor lying down. Each berthing has an associated head, including showers, vacuum-powered septic-system toilets with no urinals, since the berthings are built gender-neutral and sinks to reduce travel and traffic to access those facilities. WiFi-enabled lounges are located across the passageway in separate spaces from the berthing's racks.

Since deployment, the first two carriers of the class have run into problems with the plumbing of the waste system. The pipes were too narrow to handle the load of users, resulting in the vacuum failing and repeatedly clogged toilets. To alleviate the problem, specialized acidic cleaning solutions have been used to flush out the sewage system. These cleaning treatments cost about $400,000 each time, resulting in a substantial unplanned increase in the lifetime expense of operating these ships according to the GAO. These cleanings will have to be performed for the lifetime of the ship.

=== Medical facilities ===
Gerald R. Ford, first in the class, has an on-board hospital that includes a full laboratory, pharmacy, operating room, 3-bed intensive care unit, 2-bed emergency room, and 41-bed hospital ward, staffed by 11 medical officers and 30 hospital corpsmen.

== Construction ==
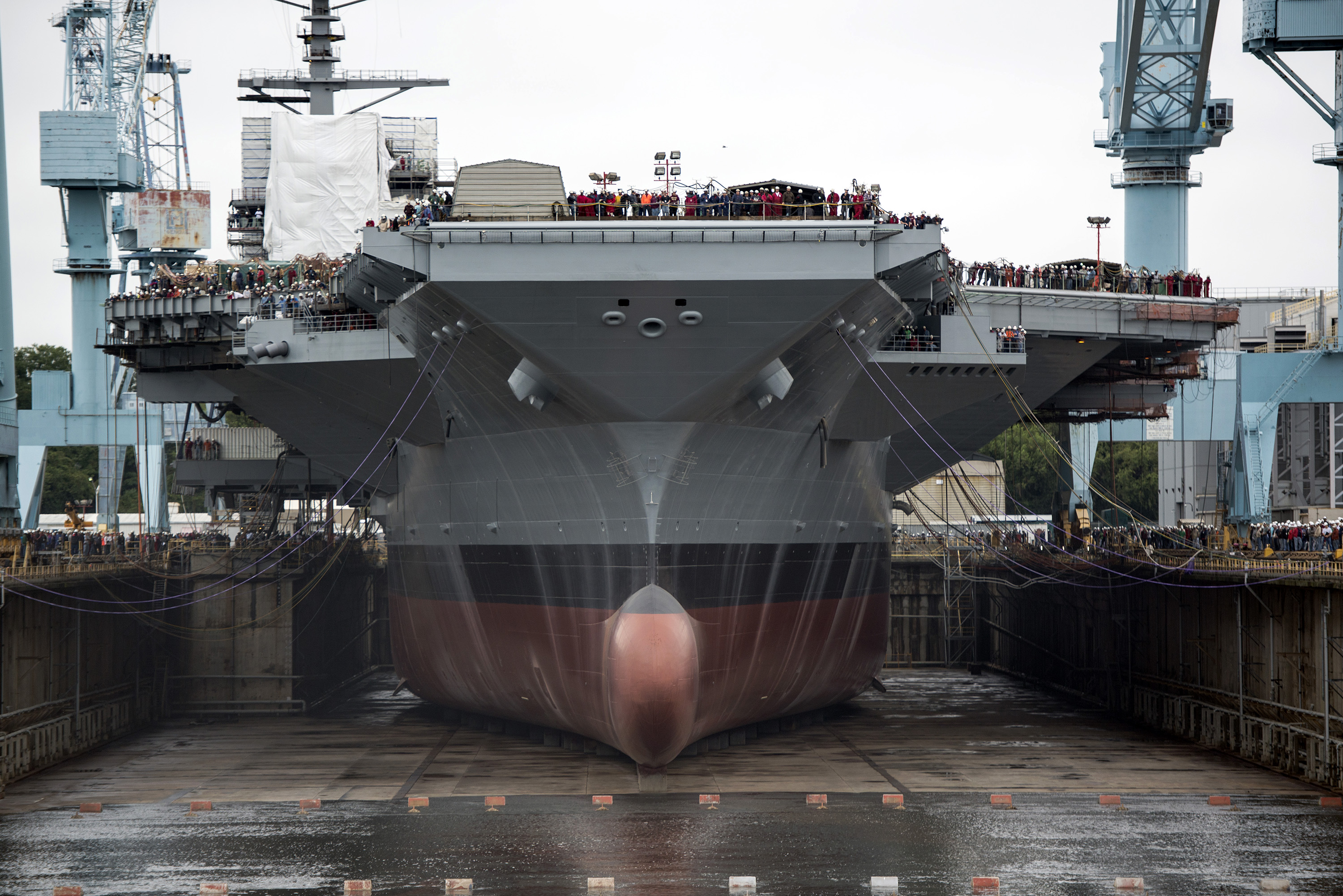
Gerald R. Ford while under construction at Newport News, along with her construction crew, 2013

Construction of the first vessel in the class, CVN-78 Gerald R. Ford, officially began on 11 August 2005, when Northrop Grumman held a ceremonial steel cut for a 15-ton plate that would form part of a side shell unit of the carrier, but construction began in earnest in early 2007. The carrier was assembled at Newport News Shipbuilding, a division of Huntington Ingalls Industries (formerly Northrop Grumman Shipbuilding) in Newport News, Virginia. This is the only shipyard in the United States that can build nuclear-powered aircraft carriers.

In 2005, Gerald R. Ford was estimated to cost at least $13 billion: $5 billion for research and development plus $8 billion to build. A 2009 report raised the estimate to $14 billion, including $9 billion for construction. In 2013, the life-cycle cost per operating day of a carrier strike group (including aircraft) was estimated at $6.5 million by the Center for New American Security.

Originally, a total of three carriers were authorized for construction, but if the Nimitz-class carriers and Enterprise were to be replaced one-for-one, 11 carriers would be required over the life of the program. The last Nimitz-class aircraft carrier is to be decommissioned in 2058.

In a speech on 6 April 2009, Secretary of Defense Robert Gates announced that each Gerald R. Ford-class carrier would be built over five years, yielding a "more fiscally sustainable path" and a 10-carrier fleet after 2040. That changed in December 2016, when Navy Secretary Ray Mabus signed a Force Structure Assessment calling for a 355-ship fleet with 12 aircraft carriers. If enacted, this policy would require each Gerald R. Ford-class carrier to be built in three to four years.

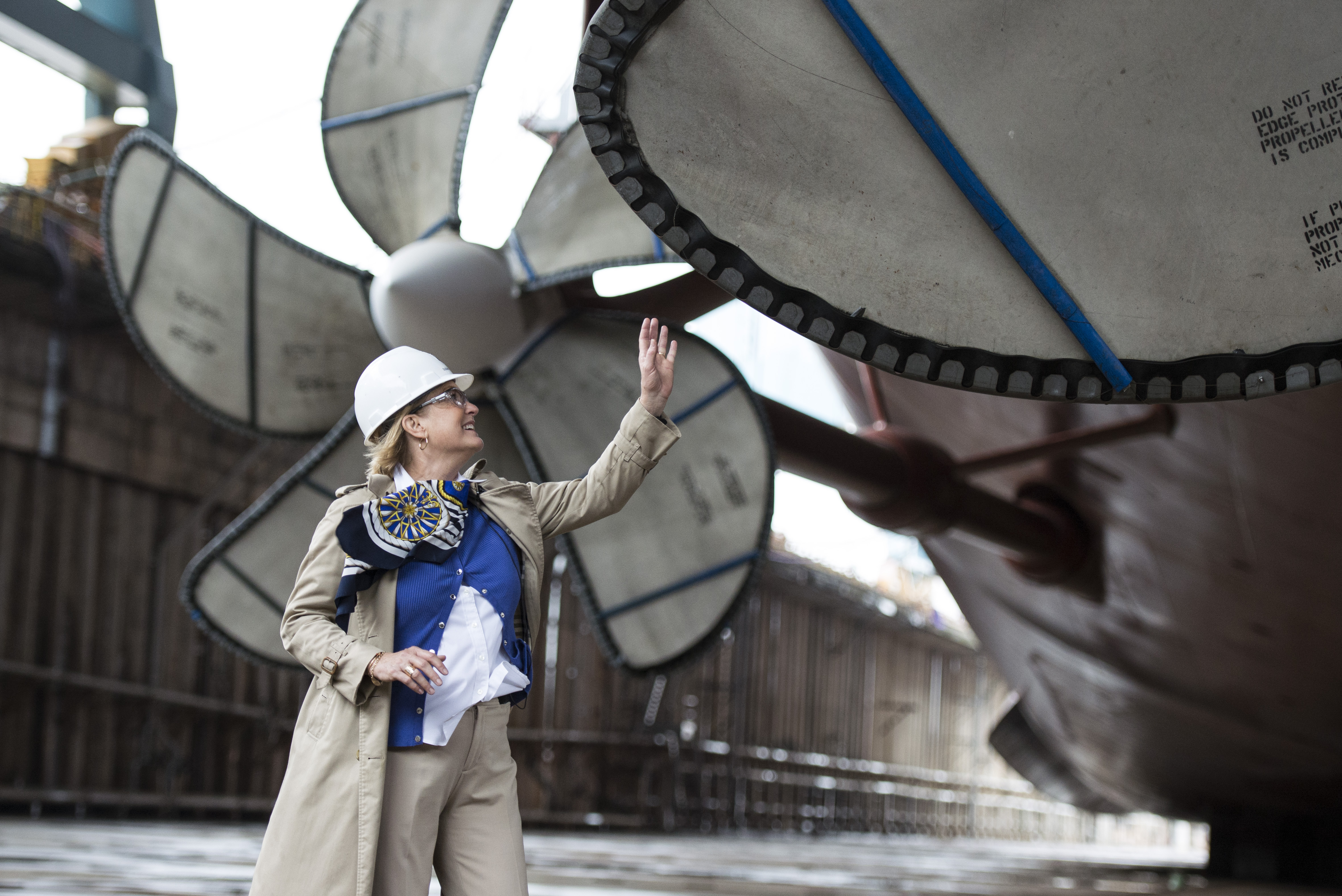
Susan Ford Bales, Gerald R. Ford's ceremonial sponsor, examines a propeller in Dry Dock No. 12 at Newport News Shipbuilding.

=== First-of-class type design changes ===
As construction of CVN-78 progressed, the shipbuilder made first-of-class type design changes, which it will use to update the model before the construction of the remaining vessels of its class. Several of these design changes related to EMALS configuration changes, which required electrical, wiring, and other changes within the ship. The Navy anticipates additional design changes stemming from remaining advanced arresting gear development and testing. According to the Navy, many of these 19,000 changes were programmed into the construction schedule early on—a result of the government's decision, at contract award, to introduce improvements to the ship's warfare systems during construction, which are heavily dependent on evolving commercial technologies.

== Naming ==
On 23 April 2013, there was a movement by the USS America (CV-66) Carrier Veterans' Association to have CVN-78 named USS America (CVN-78) rather than USS Gerald R. Ford. Instead, the America-class amphibious assault ship LHA-6 was eventually named USS America (LHA-6).

On 27 May 2011, the U.S. Department of Defense announced the name of CVN-79 would be USS John F. Kennedy after former president John F. Kennedy.

On 1 December 2012, Secretary of the Navy Ray Mabus announced the name of CVN-80 would be USS Enterprise (CVN-80) during a prerecorded speech as part of the deactivation ceremony for the world's first nuclear aircraft carrier USS Enterprise (CVN-65). CVN-80 will be the ninth ship to bear this name.

On 20 January 2020, during a ceremony at Pearl Harbor on Martin Luther King Jr. Day, Acting Secretary of the Navy Thomas B. Modly named CVN-81 in honor of Doris Miller, who anti-aircraft gunned down several planes on his own during the attack on Pearl Harbor. USS Doris Miller is the first aircraft carrier named for both an enlisted sailor and an African American. After USS Miller (FF-1091), it is the second ship named in honor of Miller, the first African American Navy Cross recipient and Medal of Honor nominee.

On 13 January 2025, President Joe Biden announced that CVN-82 and CVN-83 would be named USS William J. Clinton and USS George W. Bush after former presidents Bill Clinton and George W. Bush.

== Ships in class ==
There are expected to be ten ships of this class. To date, six have been announced:

Ship	Hull no.	Laid down	Launched	Commissioned	Status	Scheduled to replace	References
Gerald R. Ford	CVN-78	14 November 2009	17 November 2013	22 July 2017	Active, in service	Enterprise (CVN-65)	
John F. Kennedy	CVN-79	20 July 2015	29 October 2019	Expected in 2027	Sea trials	Nimitz (CVN-68)	
Enterprise	CVN-80	27 August 2022		Estimated in 2031	Under construction	Dwight D. Eisenhower (CVN-69)	
Doris Miller	CVN-81	5 December 2026 (projected)		Estimated in 2034	Planned	Carl Vinson (CVN-70)	
William J. Clinton	CVN-82				Planned	Theodore Roosevelt (CVN-71)	
George W. Bush	CVN-83				Planned	Abraham Lincoln (CVN-72)	
TBA	CVN-84				Planned		
TBA	CVN-85				Planned		
TBA	CVN-86				Planned		
TBA	CVN-87				Planned		

=== USS Gerald R. Ford (CVN-78) in the 2026 Iran War ===
During the 2026 Iran war ("Operation Epic Fury") the Gerald R. Ford served as the flagship of Carrier Strike Group 12 in the Eastern Mediterranean. The carrier used the Electromagnetic Aircraft Launch System, which allowed for a significantly higher sortie rate compared to older carriers. The Ford and her escorts helped neutralize long-range drone threats launched from Lebanese territory.

A fire broke out in the laundry area and adjacent sleeping area on the ship on 12 March 2026. Sorties were resumed two days later. On 28 March 2026, according to Reuters, the ship headed to Croatia for repairs.

== See also ==
- Modern United States Navy carrier air operations
- List of aircraft carriers
- List of naval ship classes in service
- List of current United States Navy ships
- List of aircraft carrier classes of the United States Navy
- Naval aviation
- Type 003 aircraft carrier – Chinese aircraft carrier
- Type 004 aircraft carrier – Chinese aircraft carrier in development
- Queen Elizabeth-class aircraft carrier – Royal Navy aircraft carrier class
- PANG – France future aircraft carrier project
