= Advanced Arresting Gear =

Aircraft arresting system

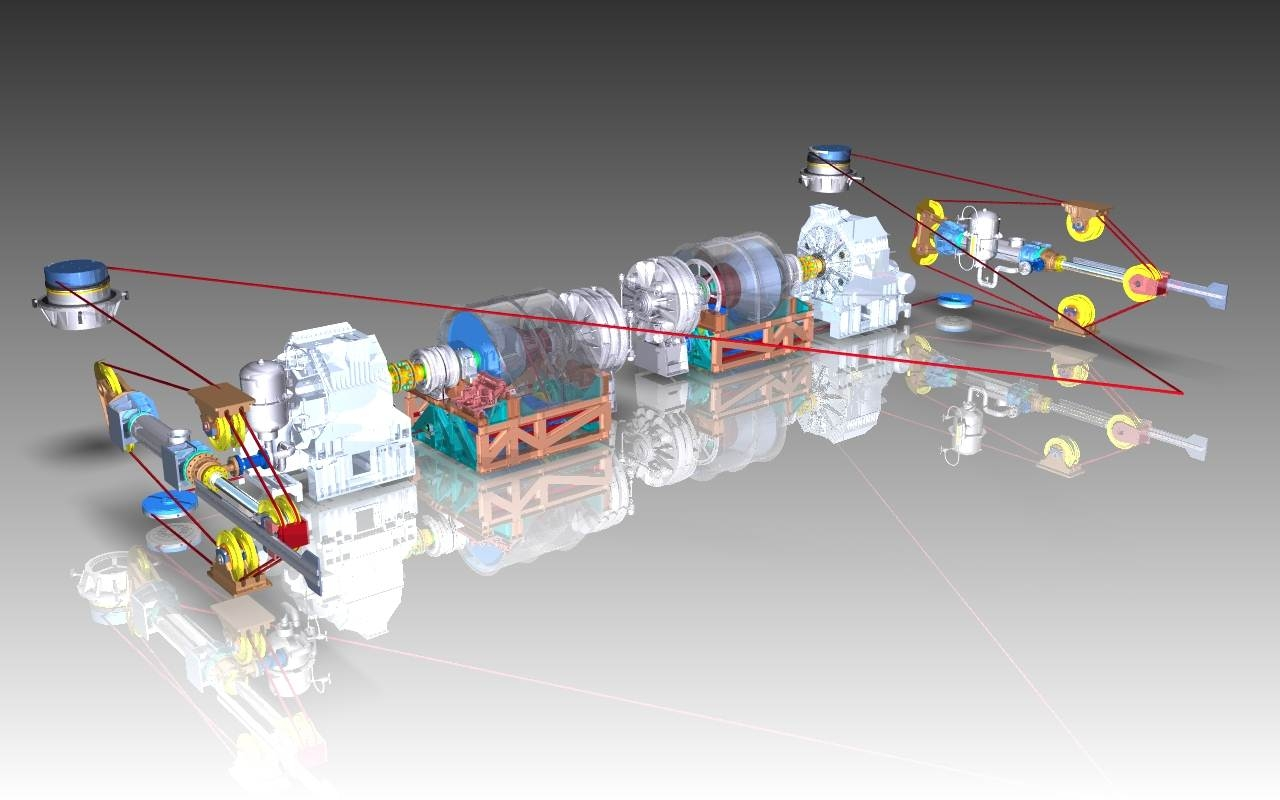
Advanced Arresting Gear for US Navy Gerald R. Ford-class aircraft carriers

The Advanced Arresting Gear (AAG) is a type of arresting gear developed by General Atomics for the U.S. Navy's newest Gerald R. Ford-class aircraft carriers. It was deployed in 2017 on the lead ship of the class, the USS Gerald R. Ford (CVN-78).

It replaces the MK 7 hydraulic arresting gear which is in use on the ten Nimitz-class aircraft carriers. The AAG is designed for a broader range of aircraft, including UAVs, while reducing manpower and maintenance. Rotary engines which use simple energy-absorbing water turbines (or twisters) coupled to a large induction motor provide finer control of the arresting forces.

== Design and development ==
On March 31, 2016, GA-EMS, in collaboration with the U.S. Navy, conducted the arrestment of an F/A-18E Super Hornet at the Runway Arrested Landing Site (RALS) located at Joint Base McGuire–Dix–Lakehurst, New Jersey. Previously, AAG tests had only involved inert loads simulating the weight of aircraft at a jet engine testing track installed at the base. The first inert load arrestment was March 27, 2011 and the first fly-in arrestment was October 13, 2016.

That site has executed more than 1,200 inert load arrestments. Testing was delayed four and a half years due primarily to a serious problem with the water twisters, discovered early in 2012. Existing water twister systems are fixed in their capacity to absorb energy. For AAG there is a variable energy dissipation by the water twister. There is an actual moving plate inside the water twister that adjusts how much resistance to the water is generated. Initially there was an underestimation of the forces involved inside the water twister because it is a three-dimensional flow field. Internal plates that take the force of the water weren't strong enough, and finding a solution proved difficult. In 2016 the Office of the Inspector General, U.S. Department of Defense found that the AAG remained unproven.

On 28 July 2017, Lt. Cmdr. Jamie "Coach" Struck of Air Test and Evaluation Squadron 23 (VX-23) performed the first arrested landing and catapult launch from Gerald R. Ford in an F/A-18F Super Hornet.

On August 2, 2019 the Navy cleared the AAG for use with the C-2A Greyhound, E-2C Hawkeye and E-2D Advanced Hawkeye, and the F/A-18E/F Super Hornet and E/A-18G Growler.

== See also ==
- Electromagnetic Aircraft Launch System
- Modern United States Navy carrier air operations
- Naval aviation
