= Electromagnetic Aircraft Launch System =

US Navy aircraft launching system

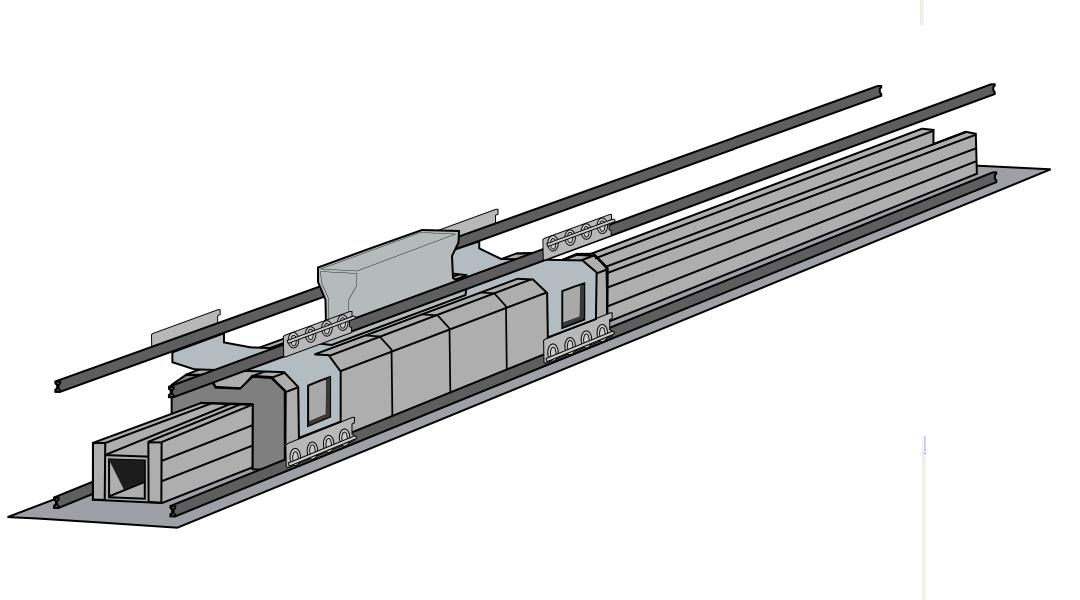
A drawing of the linear induction motor used in the EMALS

The Electromagnetic Aircraft Launch System (EMALS) is an electromagnetic catapult system developed by General Atomics for the United States Navy's CATOBAR supercarriers. The system enables assisted takeoffs of carrier-based aircraft by means of a linear induction motor-based catapult rather than the steam catapults used on the earlier Forrestal-class, Kitty Hawk-class, Enterprise-class and Nimitz-class aircraft carriers. The EMALS was first installed on the USS Gerald R. Ford, the lead ship of the new Gerald R. Ford-class aircraft carrier.

The main advantage of the EMALS over the conventional steam catapults is that it can accelerate aircraft more smoothly and gradually, thus putting less impulsive stress on their airframes. Compared to steam catapults, the EMALS system also recharges faster (as charging up electrical energy is much quicker than pressurizing gases), weighs less (as it eliminates the need to install bulky boiler, compressor, pressure vessel, plumbing and piston systems needed to produce and convey high-pressure steam), is expected to cost less and require less maintenance, and can tailor power output when launching heavier or lighter aircraft. It also significantly decreases the consumption of fresh water (which is needed to generate superheated steam for each sortie), thus optimizing on-board water storage for crew usages and reducing the demand for energy-intensive desalination.

== Design and development ==
Developed in the 1950s, steam catapults have proven exceptionally reliable. Carriers equipped with four steam catapults have been able to use at least one of them 99.5% of the time. However, there are a number of drawbacks. One group of Navy engineers wrote: "The foremost deficiency is that the catapult operates without feedback control. With no feedback, there often occurs large transients in tow force that can damage or reduce the life of the airframe." The steam system is massive, inefficient (4–6% useful work), and hard to control. These control problems allow Nimitz-class aircraft carrier steam-powered catapults to launch heavy aircraft, but not aircraft as light as many unmanned aerial vehicles.

A system somewhat similar to EMALS, Westinghouse's electropult, was developed in 1946 but not deployed.

=== Linear induction motor ===
The EMALS uses a linear induction motor (LIM), which uses alternating current (AC) to generate magnetic fields that propel a carriage along a track to launch the aircraft. The EMALS consists of four main elements: The linear induction motor consists of a row of stator coils with the same function as the circular stator coils in a conventional induction motor. When energized, the motor accelerates the carriage along the track. Only the section of the coils surrounding the carriage is energized at any given time, thereby minimizing reactive losses. The EMALS's 300-foot (91 m) LIM can accelerate a 100,000-pound (45,000 kg) aircraft to 130 kn (240 km/h; 150 mph).

=== Energy-storage subsystem ===
During a launch, the induction motor requires a large surge of electric power that exceeds what the ship's own continuous power source can provide. The EMALS energy-storage system design accommodates this by drawing power from the ship during its 45-second recharge period and storing the energy kinetically using the rotors of four disk alternators; the system then releases that energy (up to 484 MJ) in 2–3 seconds. Each rotor delivers up to 121 MJ (34 kWh) (approximately one gasoline gallon equivalent) and can be recharged within 45 seconds of a launch; this is faster than steam catapults. A maximum-performance launch using 121 MJ of energy from each disk alternator slows the rotors from 6400 rpm to 5205 rpm.

=== Power-conversion subsystem ===
During the launch, the power-conversion subsystem releases the stored energy from the disk alternators using a cycloconverter. The cycloconverter provides a controlled rising frequency and voltage to the LIM, energizing only the small portion of stator coils that affect the launch carriage at any given moment.

=== Control consoles ===
Operators control the power through a closed-loop system. Hall-effect sensors on the track monitor its operation, allowing the system to ensure that it provides the desired acceleration. The closed-loop system allows the EMALS to maintain a constant tow force, which helps reduce launch stresses on the plane's airframe.

=== Program status ===
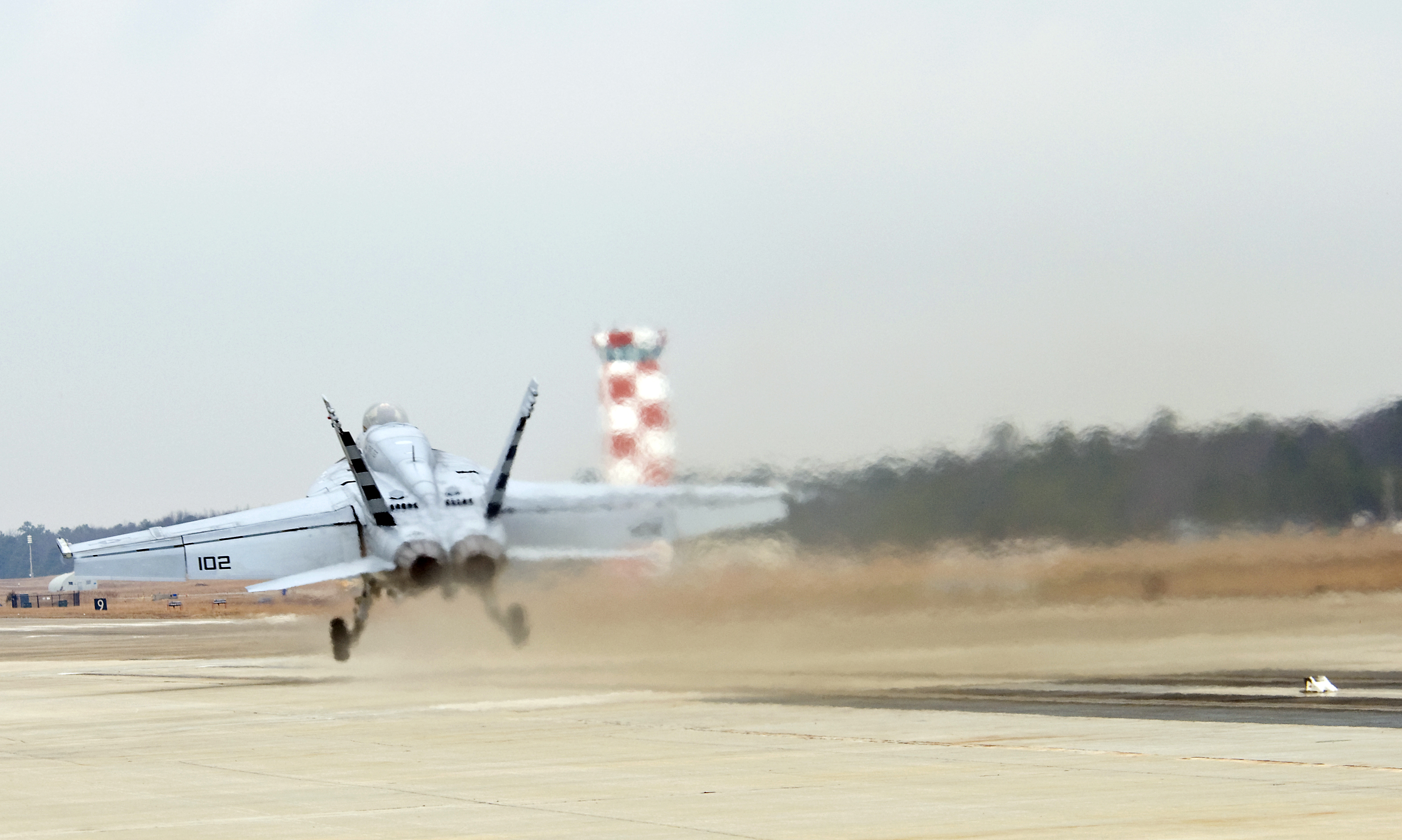
The Electromagnetic Aircraft Launch System at Naval Air Systems Command, Lakehurst, launching a United States Navy F/A-18E Super Hornet during a test on 18 December 2010

Aircraft Compatibility Testing (ACT) Phase 1 concluded in late 2011 following 134 launches (aircraft types comprising the F/A-18E Super Hornet, T-45C Goshawk, C-2A Greyhound, E-2D Advanced Hawkeye, and F-35C Lightning II) using the EMALS demonstrator installed at Naval Air Engineering Station Lakehurst. On completion of ACT 1, the system was reconfigured to be more representative of the actual ship configuration on board the USS Gerald R. Ford, which will use four catapults sharing several energy storages and power conversion subsystems.

- 1–2 June 2010: Successful launch of a McDonnell Douglas T-45 Goshawk.
- 9–10 June 2010: Successful launch of a Grumman C-2 Greyhound.
- 18 December 2010: Successful launch of a Boeing F/A-18E Super Hornet.
- 27 September 2011: Successful launch of a Northrop Grumman E-2D Advanced Hawkeye.
- 18 November 2011: Successful launch of a Lockheed Martin F-35 Lightning II.

ACT Phase 2 began on 25 June 2013 and concluded on 6 April 2014 after a further 310 launches (including launches of the Boeing EA-18G Growler and McDonnell Douglas F/A-18C Hornet, as well as another round of testing with aircraft types previously launched during Phase 1). In Phase 2, various carrier situations were simulated, including off-center launches and planned system faults, to demonstrate that aircraft could meet end-speed and validate launch-critical reliability.

- June 2014: The Navy completed EMALS prototype testing of 450 manned aircraft launches involving every fixed-wing carrier-borne aircraft type in the USN inventory at Joint Base McGuire–Dix–Lakehurst during two Aircraft Compatibility Testing (ACT) campaigns.
- May 2015: First full-speed shipboard tests conducted.

== Delivery and deployment ==
On 28 July 2017, Lt. Cmdr. Jamie "Coach" Struck of Air Test and Evaluation Squadron 23 (VX-23) performed the first EMALS catapult launch from USS Gerald R. Ford (CVN-78) in an F/A-18F Super Hornet.

By April 2021, 8,000 launch/recovery cycles had been performed with the EMALS and the AAG arrestor system aboard USS Gerald R. Ford. The USN also stated that the great majority of these cycles had occurred in the prior 18 months and that 351 pilots had completed training on the EMALS/AAG.

In 2022, USS Gerald R. Ford (CVN-78) was officially certified for flight deck operations using the EMALS.

== Advantages ==
Compared to steam catapults, EMALS weighs less, occupies less space, requires less maintenance and manpower, can in theory be more reliable, recharges quicker, and uses less energy. Steam catapults, which use about 1,350 lb (610 kg) of steam per launch, have extensive mechanical, pneumatic, and hydraulic subsystems. EMALS uses no steam, which makes it suitable for the US Navy's planned all-electric ships.

Compared to steam catapults, EMALS can control the launch performance with greater precision, allowing it to launch more kinds of aircraft, from heavy fighter jets to light unmanned aircraft. With up to 121 megajoules available, each one of the four disk alternators in the EMALS system can deliver 29% more energy than a steam catapult's approximately 95 MJ. The EMALS, with their planned 90% power conversion efficiency, will also be more efficient than steam catapults, which achieve only a 5% efficiency.

== Criticisms ==
In May 2017, President Donald Trump criticized EMALS during an interview with Time, saying that in comparison to traditional steam catapults, "the digital costs hundreds of millions of dollars more money and it's no good".

President Trump's criticism was echoed by a highly critical 2018 report from the Pentagon, which emphasized that reliability of EMALS left much to be desired and that the average rate of critical failures was nine times higher than the Navy's threshold requirements.

=== Reliability ===
In 2013, at the Lakehurst, New Jersey test site, 201 of 1,967 test launches failed, giving a 10% failure rate for the test series. Factoring in the then-current state of the system, the most generous numbers available in 2013 showed that EMALS had an average failure rate of 1 in 240 cycles.

According to a March 2015 report, "Based on expected reliability growth, the failure rate for the last reported Mean Cycles Between Critical Failure was five times higher than should have been expected. As of August 2014, the Navy has reported that over 3,017 launches have been conducted at the Lakehurst test site, but have not provided DOT&E [Director, Operational Test and Evaluation] with an update of failures."

In the test configuration, EMALS could not launch fighter aircraft with external drop tanks mounted. "The Navy has developed fixes to correct these problems, but testing with manned aircraft to verify the fixes has been postponed to 2017".

In July 2017 the system was successfully tested at sea on USS Gerald R. Ford.

A January 2021 DOT&E Report stated: "During the 3,975 catapult launches [...] EMALS demonstrated an achieved reliability of 181 mean cycles between operational mission failure (MCBOMF) [...] This reliability is well below the requirement of 4,166 MCBOMF." EMALS broke down often and was not reliable, the Pentagon's director of testing Robert Behler reported after assessing 3,975 cycles on USS Gerald R. Ford from November 2019 through September 2020.

In April 2022, Rear Adm. Shane G. Gahagan at Naval Air Systems Command said that, despite reports to the contrary, the system was working fine and had achieved 8,500 "cats and traps" on USS Gerald R. Ford over the past two years.

On 25 June 2022, the major milestone of 10,000 successful catapult launches and arrested landings aboard USS Gerald R. Ford was achieved.

A June 2022 GAO report stated "The Navy also continues to struggle with the reliability of the electromagnetic aircraft launch system and advanced arresting gear needed to meet requirements to rapidly deploy aircraft." The report also indicated the Navy did not expect EMALS and AAG to reach reliability goals until the 2030s.

A FY2023 update stated that, "DOT&E observed EMALS reliability remained consistent with recent developmental test (460 MCBOMF in FY21 and 614 MCBOMF in FY22). Despite engineering upgrades to hardware and software, reliability has not appreciably changed from prior years and reliance on off-ship technical support remains a challenge."

== Operators ==
=== Current operators ===
==== United States ====
The United States Navy is the first user of the General Atomics EMALS, which is based on four flywheel-based AC linear motor catapults. It was first installed on the USS Gerald R. Ford (CVN-78), the lead ship of the Gerald R. Ford-class supercarriers, with the same system being built on the subsequent USS John F. Kennedy (CVN-79) and USS Enterprise (CVN-80).

However, a presidential memorandum issued by 47th President Donald J. Trump on August 13, 2026 called for replacing the EMALS and Advanced Weapons Elevators with steam catapult and hydraulic systems for the planned USS Doris Miller (CVN-81), effective within 60 days of the memorandum. Trump, who previously referred to electromagnetic catapults as "digital" or "stupid electric", has been openly expressing his preference for steam catapults over EMALS since a Time interview in May 2017. Trump's directive has since come under scrutiny and criticism by the mainstream media and naval experts, who have called it "very old thinking" and "potential logistical nightmare".

=== Potential operators ===
==== France ====
The French Navy is actively planning for a future aircraft carrier and new flagship known as Porte-avions de nouvelle génération (French for "new-generation aircraft carrier") or by the acronym PANG, which was renamed to France Libre on March 18, 2026 in honor of the Free France government-in-exile led by Charles de Gaulle during World War II. Like the Charles de Gaulle it means to replace, the new aircraft carrier will be nuclear-powered and feature the three EMALS catapult system and three sets of Advanced Arresting Gear (AAG). Construction of France Libre is expected to begin around 2025, with the aviation equipment to be supplied by General Atomics under a Foreign Military Sales agreement, and the ship will enter service in 2038 when Charles de Gaulle is due to be retired.

==== India ====
The Indian Navy has shown an interest in installing an electromagnetic catapult system for the planned INS Vishal CATOBAR aircraft carrier. The Indian government has shown interest in producing the Electromagnetic Aircraft Launch System locally with technological assistance from General Atomics.

==== United Kingdom ====
Converteam UK were working on an electromagnetic catapult (EMCAT) system for the Queen Elizabeth-class aircraft carrier. In August speculation mounted that the UK may drop the STOVL F-35B for the CTOL F-35C model, which would have meant the carriers being built to operate conventional takeoff and landing aircraft using the UK-designed non-steam EMCAT catapults.

In October 2010, the UK Government announced it would buy the F-35C, using a then-undecided CATOBAR system. A contract was signed in December 2011 with General Atomics of San Diego to develop EMALS for the Queen Elizabeth-class carriers. However, in May 2012, the UK Government reversed its decision after the projected costs rose to double the original estimate and delivery moved back to 2023, cancelling the F-35C option and reverting to its original decision to buy the STOVL F-35B.

== Other developments ==
China developed an electromagnetic catapult system in the 2000s for aircraft carriers, but with a different technical approach. Chinese adopted a medium-voltage, direct current (DC) power transmission system, instead of the alternating current catapult system that United States developed.

China installed its electromagnetic catapult system on its third aircraft carrier, the Fujian (18), which entered active service with the People's Liberation Army Navy (PLAN) on November 5, 2025. This electromagnetic catapult system uses a different design based on a medium-voltage direct current (MVDC) powertrain coupled to a supercapacitor system, allowing the carrier to launch heavier and more advanced fixed-wing aircraft such as the J-35, J-15T and KJ-600, as well as the much lighter unmanned aerial vehicles, than the PLAN's two active ski-jump-based STOBAR carriers Liaoning (16) and Shandong (17). Flight tests of catapulted takeoffs were conducted during Fujian's seventh sea trial in March 2025, and video footage of the catapult launches were made public on September 22, 2025, therefore confirming China as the second country in the world (after the United States) to equip an aircraft carrier with electromagnetic catapults.

A similar catapult system might also be installed on the upcoming Type 076-class LHD Sichuan (51), enabling it to function as a drone carrier for UCAVs such as the GJ-21.

On 22 September 2025, the Chinese state broadcaster released multiple videos and photos showing the complete catapult launch and recovery (CATOBAR) sequence for Shenyang J-15, along with Shenyang J-35 and Xi'an KJ-600 aircraft on the Fujian, via the ship's electromagnetic catapults. PLA Navy also announced that J-15T, J-35 and KJ-600 were certified for CATOBAR operations, and Fujian had achieved "initial full-deck operational capability", laying the foundation for the subsequent integration with the carrier aviation wing and the carrier strike group. On 7 November 2025, CCP General Secretary Xi Jinping has officially commissioned China’s first aircraft carrier with an electromagnetic catapult system, the Fujian (CV-18). With the Fujian entering service, China joins the U.S. as the only nation operating EMALS-equipped carriers.

India's Defence Research and Development Organisation began work on an indigenous electromagnetic catapult. A small-scale demonstrator capable of launching payloads up to 400 kg over a short span of 16 to 18 meters was successfully built by Pune based Research & Development Establishment (Engineers). The electromagnetic catapult technology is now being scaled up for use on aircraft carriers. Platforms weighing up to forty tons can be handled by the proposed system.

== See also ==
- Coilgun
- Railgun
- Mass driver
- Modern United States Navy carrier air operations
- Naval aviation
