= USS Miller (FF-1091) =

US Navy Knox class frigate

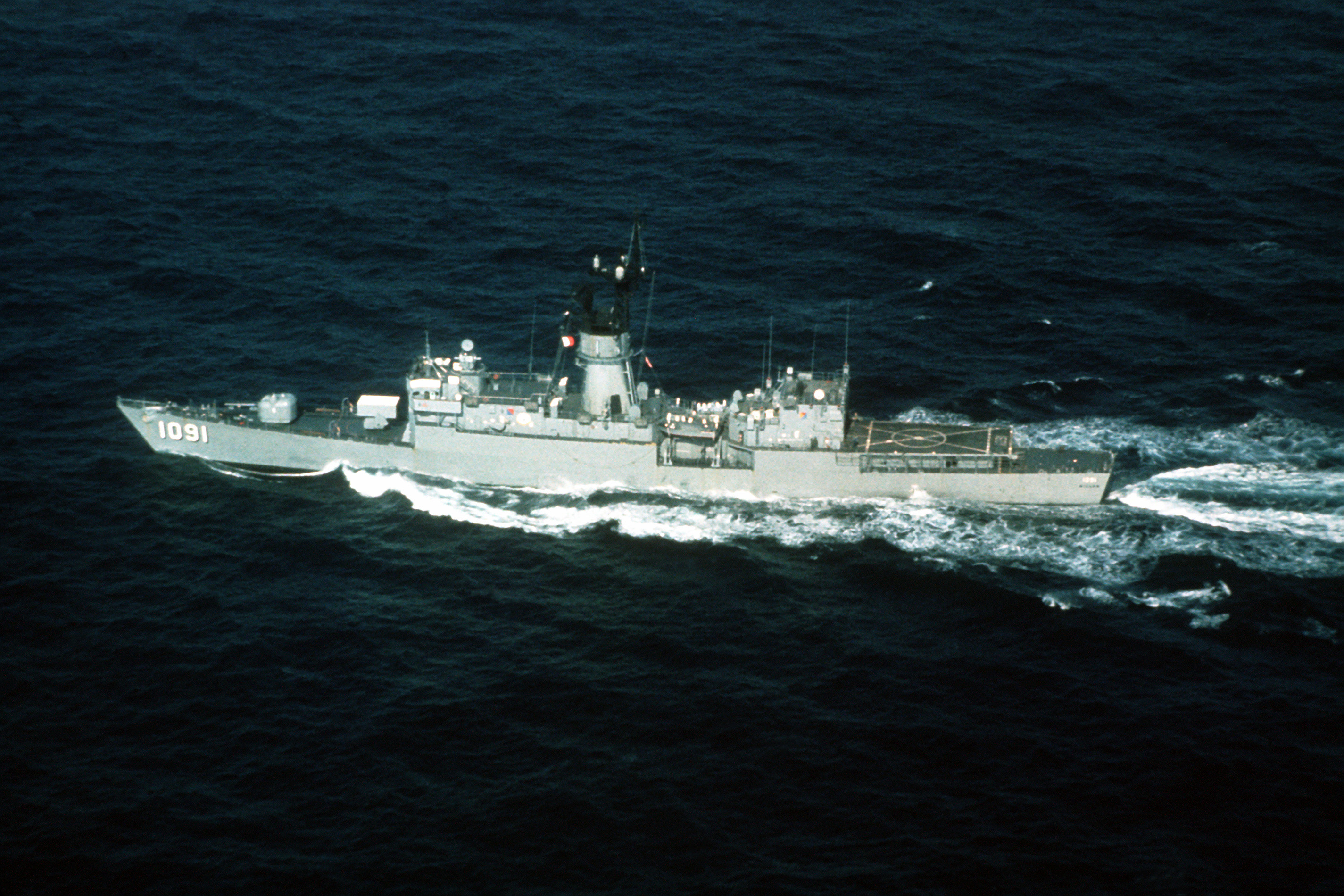
- USS Miller (FF-1091)

History

United States
- Name: Miller
- Namesake: Doris "Dorie" Miller
- Ordered: 25 August 1966
- Builder: Avondale Shipyard, Avondale, Louisiana
- Laid down: 6 August 1971
- Launched: 3 June 1972
- Acquired: 13 April 1973
- Commissioned: 30 June 1973
- Decommissioned: 15 October 1991
- Stricken: 11 January 1995
- Motto: Courage-Devotion
- Fate: Sold to Turkey as a hulk (19 July 1999); subsequently sunk as a target in the Turkish Seawolf 2001 naval exercise, June 2001

General characteristics
- Class & type: Knox-class frigate
- Displacement: 3,201 long tons (3,252 t) light; 4,182 long tons (4,249 t) full load
- Length: 438 ft (134 m)
- Beam: 46 ft 9 in (14.25 m)
- Draft: 24 ft 9 in (7.54 m)
- Propulsion: 2 × CE 1,200 psi (8.3 MPa) boilers; 1 Westinghouse geared turbine; 1 shaft, 35,000 shp (26 MW)
- Speed: over 27 knots
- Complement: 18 officers, 267 enlisted
- Sensors & processing systems: AN/SPS-40 Air Search Radar; AN/SPS-67 Surface Search Radar; AN/SQS-26 Sonar; AN/SQR-18 Towed array sonar system; Mk68 Gun Fire Control System
- Electronic warfare & decoys: AN/SLQ-32 Electronics Warfare System
- Armament: one Mk-16 8 cell missile launcher for RUR-5 ASROC and Harpoon missiles; one 5"/54 caliber Mark 42 gun; Mark 46 torpedoes from four single tube launchers)
- Aircraft carried: one SH-2 Seasprite (LAMPS I) helicopter

USS Miller (FF-1091), originally (DE-1091), was a Knox-class destroyer escort in the United States Navy. She was named for Cook Third Class Doris "Dorie" Miller, who was awarded the Navy Cross for his actions at the attack on Pearl Harbor.

== Design and description ==
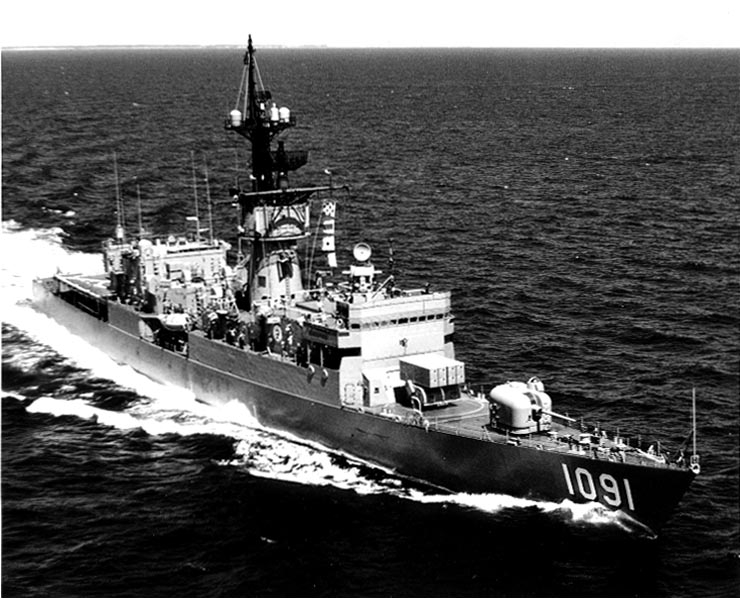
USS Miller (FF-1091)

The Knox-class design was derived from the Brooke-class frigate modified to extend range and without a long-range missile system. The ships had an overall length of 438 feet (133.5 m), a beam of 47 feet (14.3 m) and a draft of 25 feet (7.6 m). They displacement 4,066 long tons (4,131 t) at full load. Their crew consisted of 13 officers and 211 enlisted men.

The ships were equipped with one Westinghouse geared steam turbine that drove the single propeller shaft. The turbine was designed to produce 35,000 shaft horsepower (26,000 kW), using steam provided by 2 C-E boilers, to reach the designed speed of 27 knots (50 km/h; 31 mph). The Knox class had a range of 4,500 nautical miles (8,300 km; 5,200 mi) at a speed of 20 knots (37 km/h; 23 mph).

The Knox-class ships were armed with a 5"/54 caliber Mark 42 gun forward and a single 3-inch/50-caliber gun aft. They mounted an eight-round RUR-5 ASROC launcher between the 5-inch (127 mm) gun and the bridge. Close-range anti-submarine defense was provided by two twin 12.75-inch (324 mm) Mk 32 torpedo tubes. The ships were equipped with a torpedo-carrying DASH drone helicopter; its telescoping hangar and landing pad were positioned amidships aft of the mack. Beginning in the 1970s, the DASH was replaced by a SH-2 Seasprite LAMPS I helicopter and the hangar and landing deck were accordingly enlarged. Most ships also had the 3-inch (76 mm) gun replaced by an eight-cell BPDMS missile launcher in the early 1970s.

== Construction and career ==
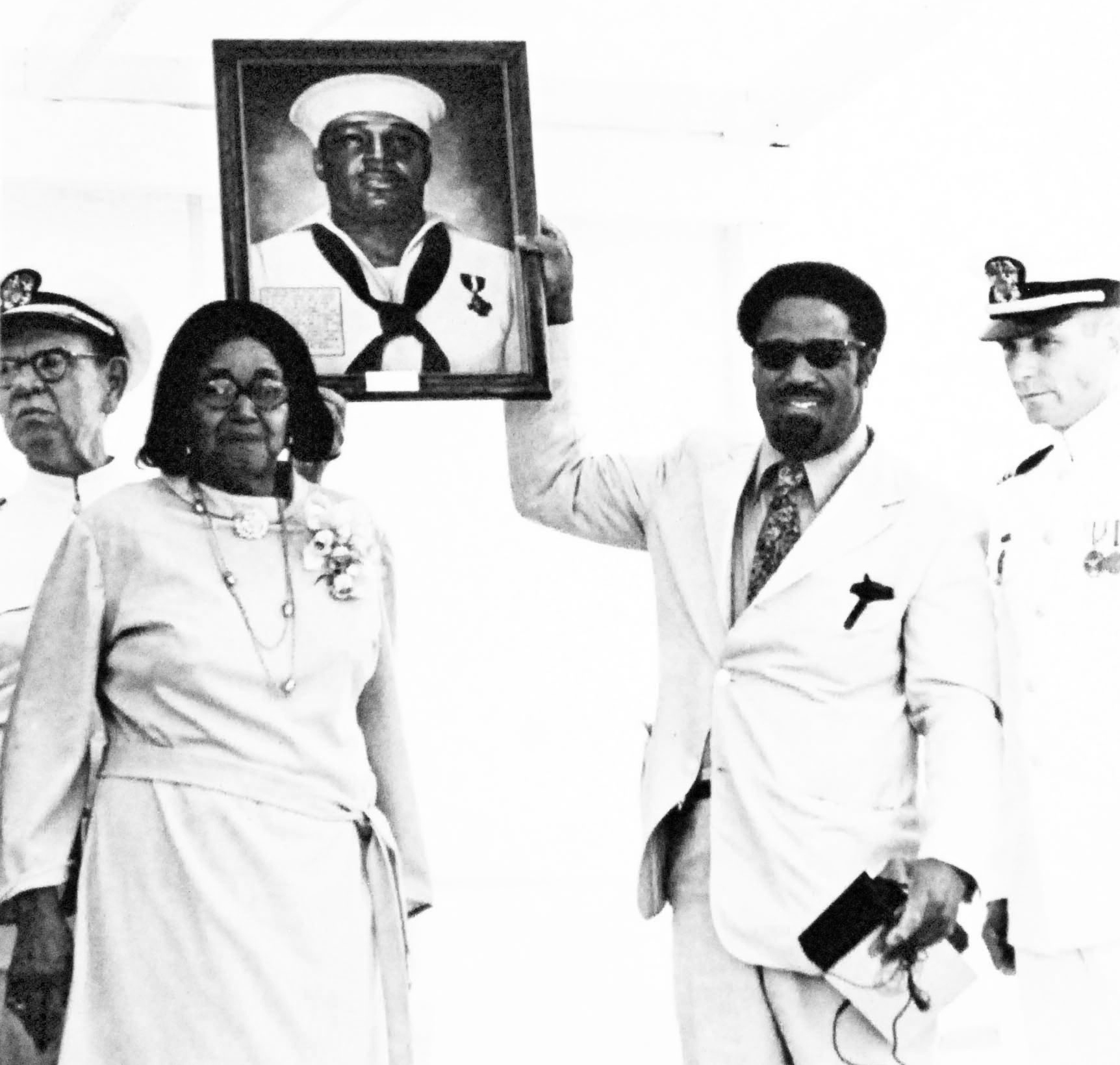
Henrietta Miller, mother of Doris Miller and sponsor for USS Miller, attending 1973 commissioning ceremony at the Norfolk Naval Shipyard

Miller was built at Avondale, Louisiana. Commissioned in June 1973, her active service was performed with the Atlantic Fleet, including deployments to the Mediterranean, Northern Europe, the Persian Gulf, and the Black Sea. In July 1975, she was reclassified as a frigate and redesignated FF-1091. Miller transferred to the Naval Reserve Force in January 1982, based in Newport, Rhode Island and, thereafter, was employed in the western Atlantic & Caribbean areas. She was decommissioned in October 1991 and stricken from the Naval Vessel Register in 1995. In 1999, she was transferred to Turkey as a hulk and, in 2001, was sunk as a target in a Turkish naval exercise.
