= A4W reactor =

U.S. Navy nuclear reactor

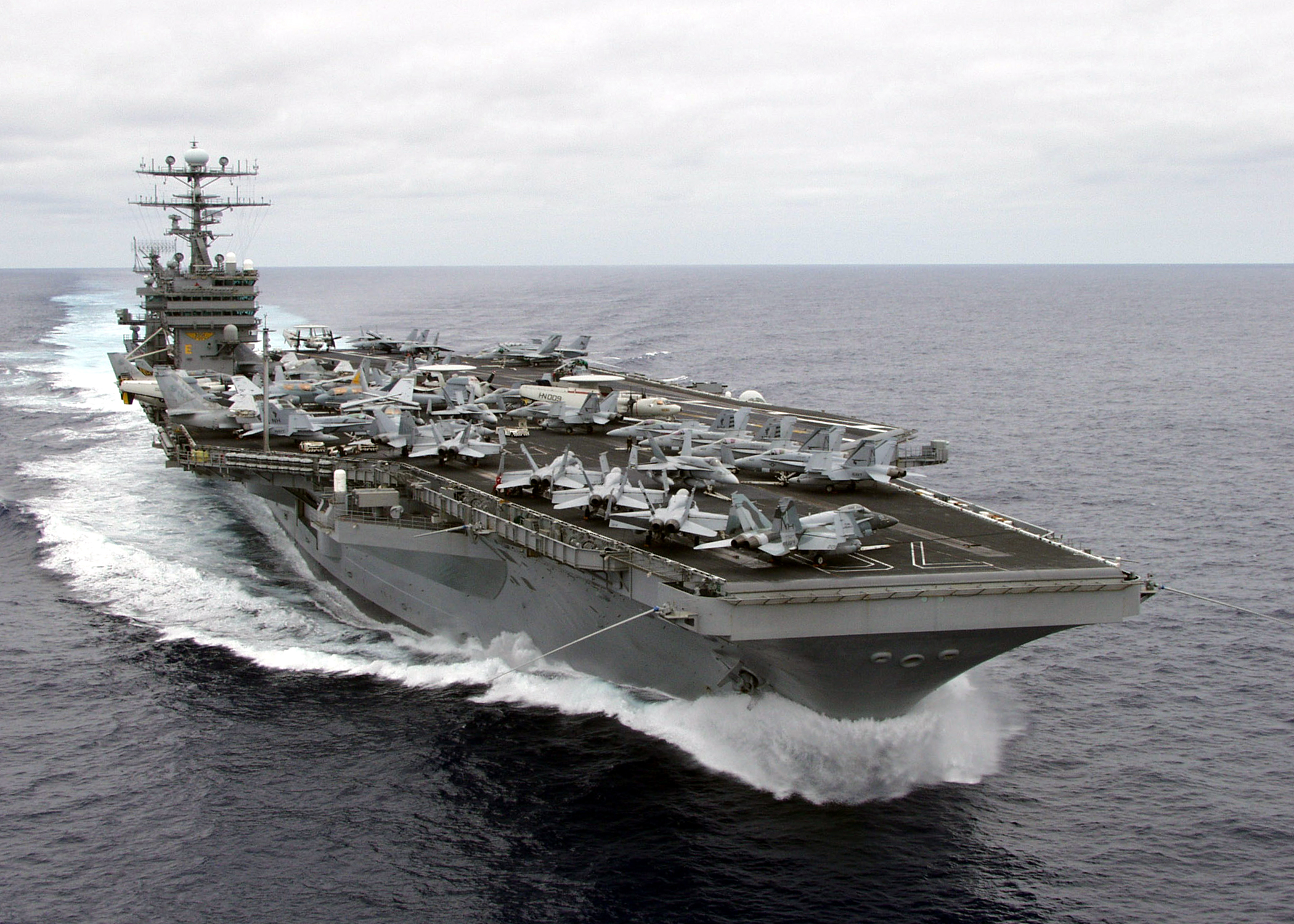
The USS Carl Vinson

The A4W reactor is a naval reactor used by the United States Navy to propel warships and generate onboard electricity.

The A4W designation stands for:

- A = Aircraft carrier platform
- 4 = Contractor's fourth core design generation
- W = Westinghouse, the contracted designer

== History ==
These nuclear fission pressurized water reactors (PWRs) were jointly designed by Bettis Atomic Power Laboratory and Knolls Atomic Power Laboratory and built by Westinghouse Electric Company. Their reactor cores are expected to operate for about 25 years before refueling is required. The only ships to use these nuclear reactors are the Nimitz-class supercarriers, which have two reactors rated at 550 MW_{th} each. These generate enough steam to produce 140,000 shaft horsepower (104 MW) for each pair of the ship's four shafts – two per propulsion plant – plus approximately 100 MW of electricity.

== See also ==
- A1B reactor
- List of United States naval reactors
- Nimitz-class aircraft carrier
- Robert McNamara as Secretary of Defense § Naval aviation
