= USS John F. Kennedy (CVN-79) =

Gerald R. Ford-class aircraft carrier

- John F. Kennedy underway during aircraft compatibility testing in 2026

History

United States
- Name: John F. Kennedy
- Namesake: John F. Kennedy
- Awarded: 15 January 2009
- Builder: Huntington Ingalls Industries
- Cost: US$11.341 billion
- Laid down: 20 July 2015
- Launched: 29 October 2019
- Sponsored by: Caroline Kennedy
- Christened: 7 December 2019
- Identification: CVN-79
- Motto: "Serve with courage"
- Status: Sea trials
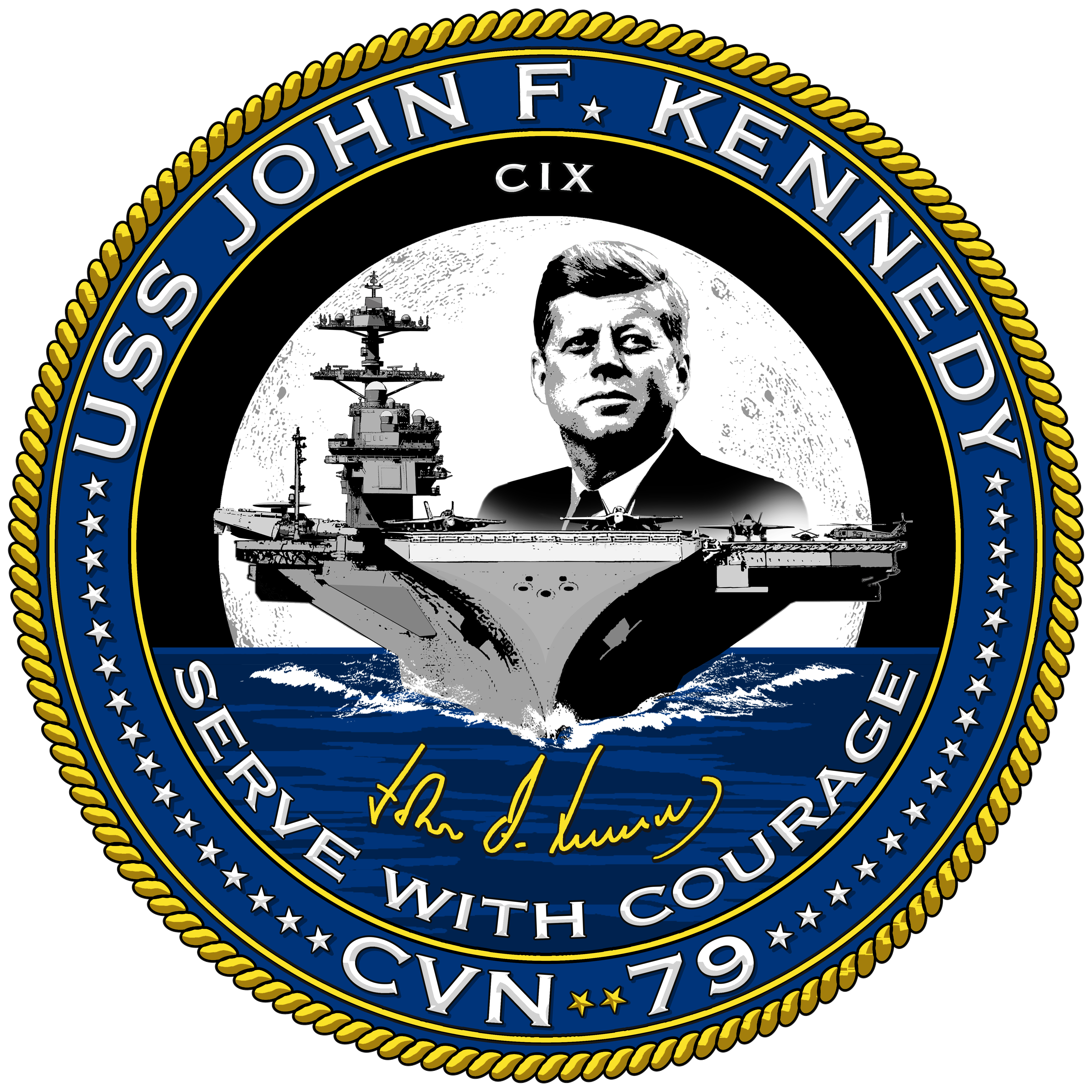
- Badge

General characteristics
- Class & type: Gerald R. Ford-class aircraft carrier
- Displacement: About 100,000 long tons (100,000 tonnes) (full load)
- Length: 1,106 ft (337 m)
- Beam: 134 ft (41 m) (waterline); 256 ft (78 m) (flight deck)
- Draft: 39 ft (12 m)
- Installed power: Two A1B nuclear reactors
- Propulsion: Four shafts
- Speed: In excess of 30 knots (56 km/h; 35 mph)
- Range: Unlimited distance; 20–25 years
- Complement: 4,660
- Sensors & processing systems: AN/SPY-6(V)3 Enterprise Air Surveillance Radar (EASR) S band active electronically scanned array; AN/SPY-3 X Band Air Search Radar; AN/SPQ-9B X band surface search radar
- Armament: Anti-aircraft missiles: 2 × Mark 29 GMLS equipped with 8 x RIM-162D/G Evolved Sea Sparrow Missiles each; 2 × Mark 49 GMLS equipped with 21 x RIM-116 Rolling Airframe Missiles each; Guns: 3 × Mark 15 Block 1B 20mm Phalanx CIWS; 4 × Mk 38 25 mm Machine Gun Systems; 4 × M2A1 50BMG .50 Cal. (12.7 mm NATO Round) machine guns
- Aircraft carried: More than 80, can hold up to 90 combat aircraft
- Aviation facilities: 1,092 ft × 256 ft (333 m × 78 m) flight deck

USS John F. Kennedy (CVN-79) is the second Gerald R. Ford-class aircraft carrier built for the United States Navy. She was launched on 29 October 2019, and christened on 7 December 2019. She is currently scheduled to be delivered to the Navy in March 2027.

== Naming ==
On 7 December 2007, the 66th anniversary of the attack on Pearl Harbor, Arizona congressman Harry Mitchell proposed naming this ship Arizona. In 2008 and 2009, there were proposals in Congress to name either the CVN-79 or the subsequent CVN-80 Barry M. Goldwater, after the late U.S. senator of the same state. On 29 May 2011, the Department of Defense announced that the ship would be named for John F. Kennedy, the 35th president of the United States, who served in the Navy during World War II. She is the third navy ship named after members of the Kennedy family, and the second aircraft carrier named John F. Kennedy, succeeding USS John F. Kennedy (CV-67), which was active from 1968 to 2007.

== Construction ==
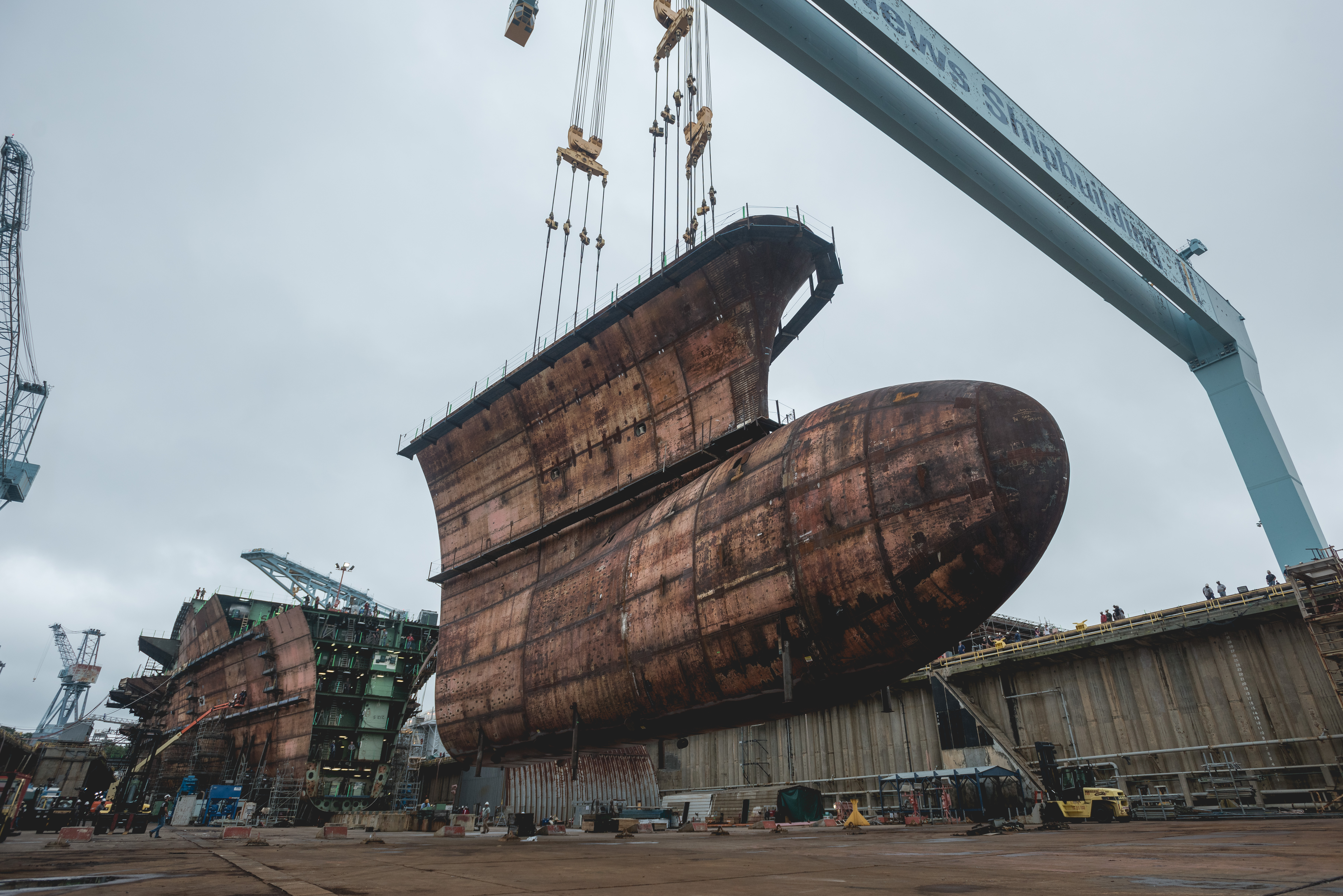
John F. Kennedy being constructed in September 2018

On 15 January 2009, Huntington Ingalls Industries (HII) Northrop Grumman Shipbuilding was awarded a $374-million contract for design work and construction preparation for John F. Kennedy. On 30 September 2010, Northrop Grumman announced that preparations were under way to begin construction. On 25 February 2011, the Navy conducted the First Cut of Steel ceremony at Northrop Grumman in Newport News, signalling the formal start of construction for John F. Kennedy.

John F. Kennedy was originally planned to be completed in 2018, but this deadline was extended to 2020 after Secretary of Defense Robert Gates announced in 2009 a shift to a five-year building program for the sake of fiscal sustainability. By late 2012, delays had occurred in construction, and the Navy Department was investigating extending the construction time of both Enterprise and John F. Kennedy by an additional two years, which could delay the carrier's entry into service until 2022. In September 2013, the Government Accountability Office recommended delaying the detail design and construction contract for John F. Kennedy until programmatic shortfalls are sorted out, based on technical, design, and construction challenges in completing Gerald R. Ford. Both the Navy and Defense Department rejected the recommendation.

The ship's keel was laid in Newport News, Virginia on 22 August 2015. As part of the traditional keel laying ceremony, the initials of ship sponsor Caroline Kennedy, daughter of President Kennedy and the sponsor of the previous John F. Kennedy, were welded into the ship's hull. As of late June 2017 the ship was 50% structurally complete. On 28 February 2018, HII announced that its Newport News Shipbuilding division had built 70% of the structures necessary to complete John F. Kennedy. On 30 April 2018, HII announced that she was "75 percent structurally erected and more than 40 percent complete." On 3 May 2018 HII President & CEO Mike Petters reported that John F. Kennedy was to be launched three months ahead of schedule on 29 October 2019. On 30 May 2019 the 588-ton bridge and island was installed. Under the island Captain Todd Marzano (the final commander of the previous John F. Kennedy), placed his wings and the first Kennedy half dollar, which was donated by Caroline Kennedy, was put in place. Next to these Rear Admiral Brian Antonio (former program executive officer for aircraft carriers), Rear Admiral Roy Kelley (commander, Naval Air Force Atlantic), and Jennifer Boykin (president, Newport News Shipbuilding) placed coins each embossed with quotes from President Kennedy and parts of the ship's motto. Caroline could not be present, so the order was given via radio for the crane operator to lift the island and set it down on the deck over the ceremonial items and entombing them in the ship's superstructure. The ship was fully completed on 11 July 2019 with the installation of the upper bow and launch deck consisting of the ship's two forward catapults.

On 1 October 2019, the ship's crew was activated for the first time as Pre-Commissioning Unit (PCU) John F. Kennedy at a ceremony aboard the vessel at Newport News Shipbuilding. On 29 October 2019, Newport News Shipbuilding began flooding the dry dock where John F. Kennedy has been under construction. The process of filling the dry dock with more than 100,000,000 US gallons (380,000,000 L; 83,000,000 imp gal) of water took place over several days, and it marked the first time the ship has been in water. Once the ship was afloat, she was moved to west end of the dry dock. The ship was christened on 7 December 2019 by Caroline Kennedy, who reenacted the bottle bash she did when the first John F. Kennedy (CV-67) was christened 52 years earlier.

In November 2020, HII received a nine-figure modification on an earlier contract to accomplish CVN 79 "single phase delivery and Joint Strike Fighter (F-35C) capabilities" in Newport News, Virginia. According to the contract announcement, the "single-phase delivery approach" is adopted "to meet both Fleet requirements and a congressional mandate of ensuring that CVN 79 is capable of operating and deploying Joint Strike Fighter (F-35C) aircraft before completing the post-shakedown availability (PSA) as codified in Section 124 of the fiscal 2020 National Defense Authorization Act (Public Law 116-92)." The ship first tested her Electromagnetic Aircraft Launch System in 2022, and her combat system in 2023. In the same year, the U.S. Navy awarded a contract worth almost $400 million to HII for upgrades to the ship's flight deck, island, and weapon systems. In February 2024 HII and the Navy began dead load testing and the first sleds were shot off the deck in late February until the end of April. With the extra work moved into the base construction period, starting in 2023, the delivery schedule from mid-2024 to sometime in 2025, but moves up the date when she will be in full service, because less of the otherwise extensive finishing work will be left for the post-delivery post-shakedown period.

On 8 April 2025, the Navy announced that the carrier's planned July delivery date would likely be missed. The new delivery date is March 2027.

On 28 January 2026, USS John F. Kennedy departed Newport News Shipbuilding for initial sea trials. She successfully completed her builder's initial builder sea trials on 5 February. Later in 2026, she carried out acceptance sea trials, allowing the Navy to begin the process of preliminary acceptance into the fleet.

== See also ==
External videos
- on the official YouTube channel of HI Industries (in English)
- Building John F. Kennedy (CVN 79) on YouTube
- Bringing John F. Kennedy (CVN 79) to Life on YouTube
- John F. Kennedy (#CVN79) Christening Ceremony on YouTube

- List of aircraft carriers of the United States Navy
- List of memorials to John F. Kennedy
