= A1B reactor =

Naval nuclear reactor

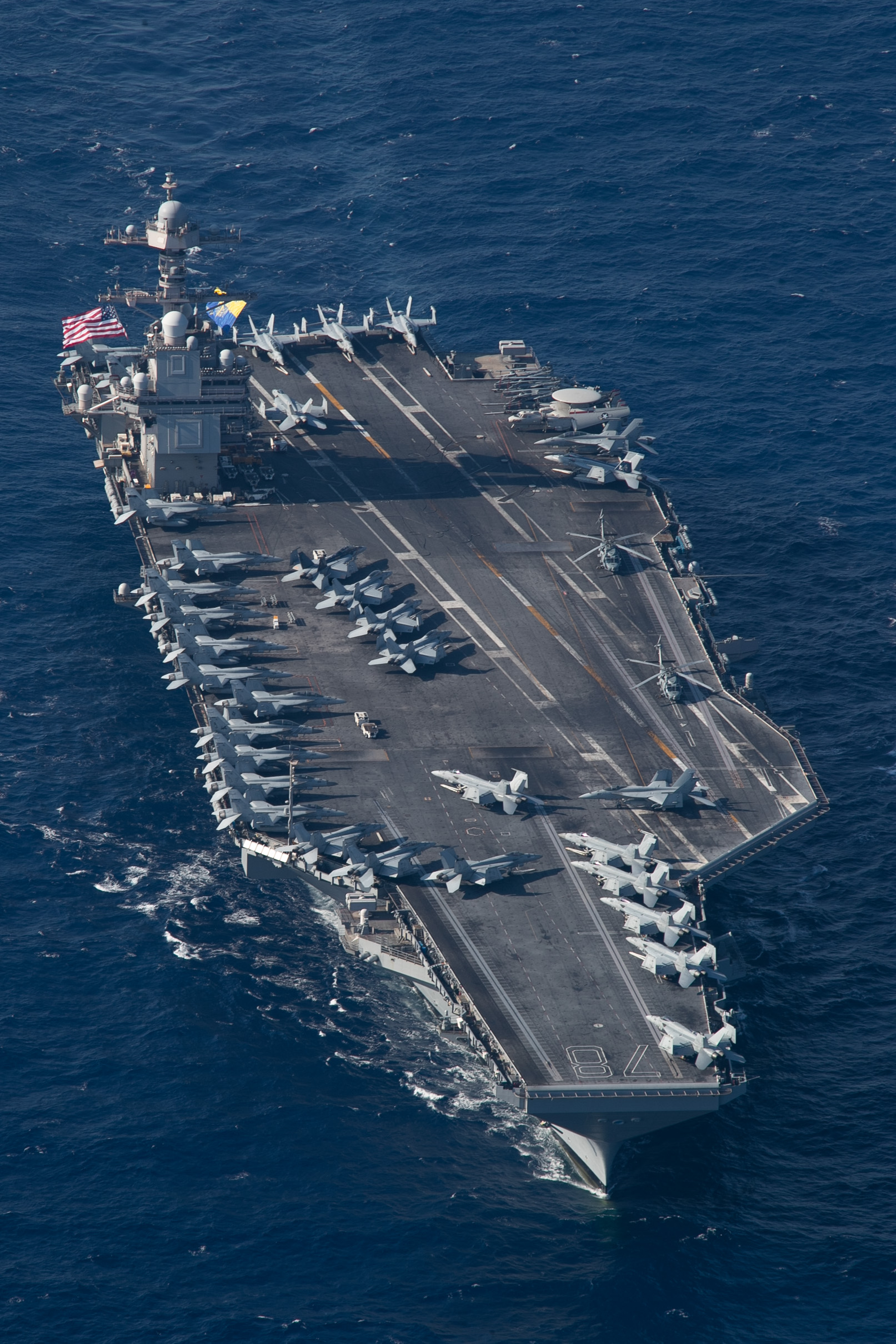
The Gerald R. Ford (CVN-78) underway in the Mediterranean Sea in August 2023

The A1B reactor was developed by the United States Navy for the Gerald R. Ford-class nuclear-powered aircraft carriers. Each ship is powered by two A1B reactors. The reactor was named A1B, following the Navy's reactor-designation scheme of type, generation, and manufacturer: A for aircraft carrier, 1 for the maker's first reactor plant design, and B for Bechtel, the company making the reactor.

As Navy planners developed requirements for the Gerald R. Ford class, they concluded that the A4W reactors that powered the previous Nimitz-class aircraft carriers offer too little power for current and anticipated future shipboard needs, and decided to commission a new reactor design from Bechtel Corporation, which has "performed engineering and/or construction services on more than 80 percent of [land-based] nuclear plants in the United States." The A1B reactor is more efficient, more adaptable, smaller, and lighter than the A4W design. It also has improved operator interfaces.

Nuclear reactors power aircraft carriers by the fission of enriched uranium to boil water, causing turbines to turn and generate electricity. This process is largely the same as in land-based nuclear power stations, but with one notable difference. Naval reactors directly use turboshaft power for turning the ship's screws. Over decades of development several other design differences have emerged between naval reactors and the usually much larger power station reactors.

It is estimated that the thermal power output of each A1B will be around 700 MW_{th}, some 25% more than provided by the A4W. Improved efficiency in the total plant is expected to provide improved output to both propulsion and electrical systems. Using A4W data with a 25% increase in thermal power, the A1B reactors are likely to produce enough steam to generate 125 megawatts (168,000 hp) of electricity per reactor, providing 350,000 shaft horsepower (260 MW) when working in tandem to power the four propeller shafts.

The greater electrical generation capacity will allow for elimination of service steam on the ship, reducing staffing requirements for maintenance. In addition, the use of electromagnetic aircraft catapults (EMALS) will free the ship's air wing from the constraints of pressurized steam, used aboard the Nimitz-class carriers.

== See also ==
- A4W reactor
- List of aircraft carriers of the US Navy
- List of United States naval reactors
- Nuclear marine propulsion
- Nuclear power in the United States
