= John F. Meier =

U.S. Navy admiral

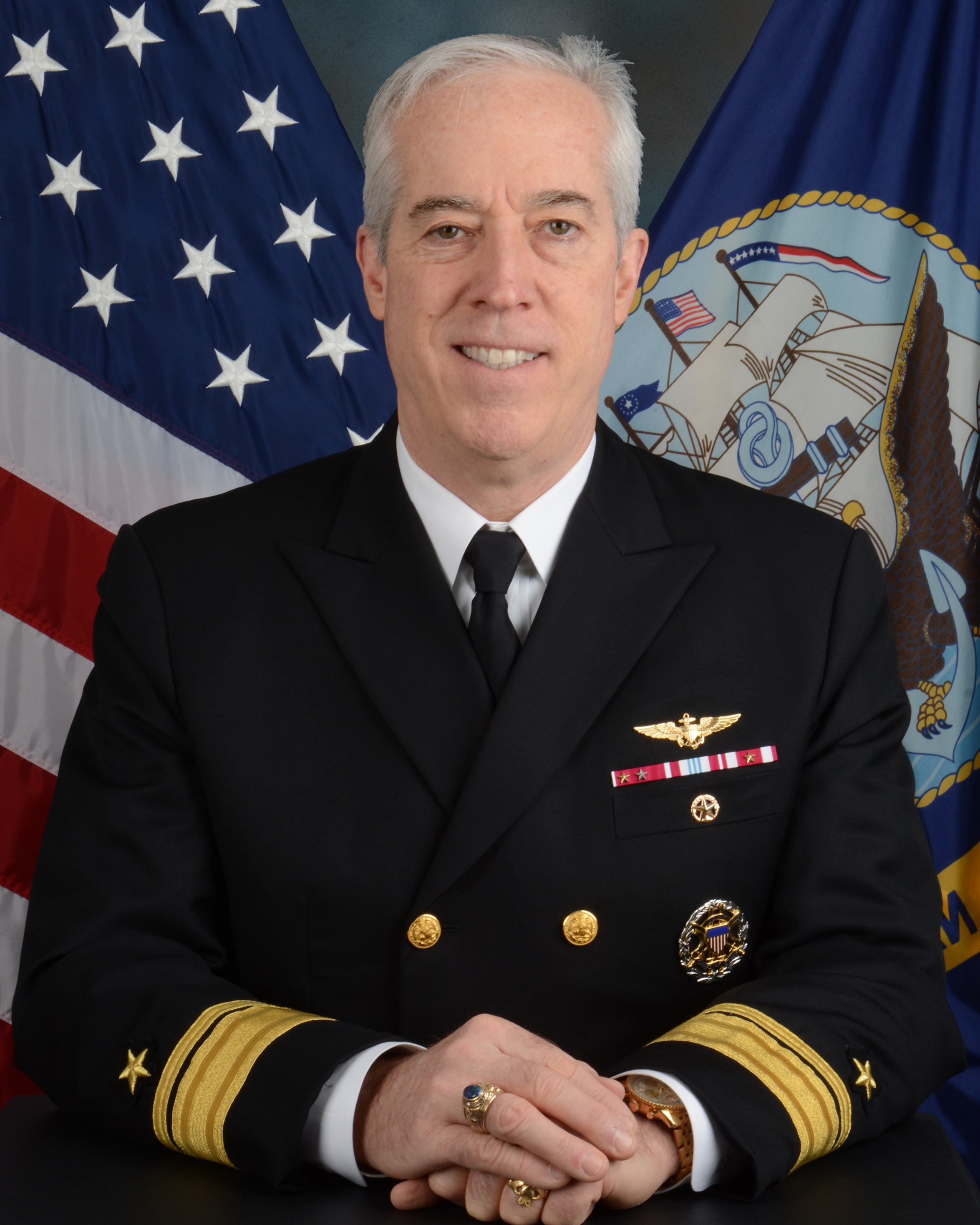
- Official portrait, 2021
- Born: 1964 (age 61–62); Aberdeen Proving Ground, Maryland, U.S.
- Military career
- Allegiance: United States
- Branch: United States Navy
- Service years: 1986–2023
- Rank: Rear Admiral
- Commands: Naval Air Force Atlantic; Navy Warfare Development Command; Carrier Strike Group 10; USS Gerald R. Ford (CVN-78); USS Gunston Hall (LSD-44); VAQ-136

John Francis Meier (born 1964) is a retired United States Navy rear admiral who last served as the Commander of Naval Air Force Atlantic from May 1, 2020 to August 17, 2023. Previously, he was Commander of Navy Warfare Development Command from July 3, 2019, to May 18, 2020.

Born at Aberdeen Proving Ground, Maryland and raised in Export, Pennsylvania, Meier is a 1982 graduate of Franklin Regional High School. He then attended the United States Naval Academy, graduating in 1986 with a B.S. degree in general engineering. In August 1988, Meier completed flight training in Beeville, Texas and became a naval aviator.

Meier married Rachel Diane Edwards on December 5, 1990 in Island County, Washington. The couple have two sons.

Military offices
New office	Commander of the USS Gerald R. Ford (CVN-78); 201?–2016	Succeeded by Richard C. McCormack
Preceded by ???	Assistant Commander for Career Management of the Navy Personnel Command; 201?–2018	Succeeded by Richard J. Cheeseman Jr.
Preceded by Samuel Paparo	Commander of Carrier Strike Group 10; 2018–2019	Succeeded by Paul J. Schlise
Preceded by Marcus A. Hitchcock	Commander of Navy Warfare Development Command; 2019–2020	Succeeded by Fred I. Pyle
Preceded by Roy J. Kelley	Commander of Naval Air Force Atlantic; 2020–2023	Succeeded by Douglas C. Verissimo
