= Cross-deck (naval terminology) =

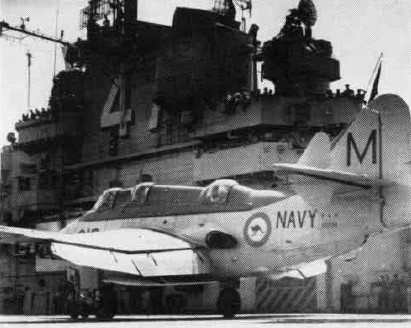
An Australian Fairey Gannet from HMAS Melbourne on the flight deck of USS Philippine Sea during a cross-decking exercise in 1958

Cross-deck (or cross-decking) is naval jargon which may refer to either informal, ad-hoc sharing of resources between naval vessels (historical usage), or the use of carrier decks (or vessel borne helipads) to host aircraft of foreign allies, aircraft from other ships in the same navy, or as re-fueling platforms for naval aircraft to extend flight operations beyond the range of the aircraft type. The operations may be entirely within a single navy, or between allied navies such as defined in the HOSTAC agreement. This may be required for ferrying aircraft or supplies, power projection operations involving fixed or rotary-wing aircraft, or to provide flexibility in operating limited numbers of specialized aircraft (such as the EA-6B Prowler electronic warfare aircraft) over a wide theatre of operations. Spare parts that can be lifted by helicopter are often crossed decked between ships operating compatible equipment (especially if they are the same ship class), to reduce redundancy in carrying spares.

Individual personnel may be cross-decked due to their required specialities being in need. Rarely, entire crews can be cross-decked to a newly commissioned ship from either a decommissioning vessel (e.g. from USCGC Bonham to USCGC Modoc), or a vessel undergoing prolonged repair or renovation. More commonly, a core group of experienced personnel may be cross-decked to a new ship to allow the vessel to come to full readiness more quickly. Generally, a move of this type will be between ships with similar missions, though not necessarily the same ship class. This can be seen as a means of propagating institutional knowledge.

Entire naval air units, up to and including naval air squadrons, may be transferred to re-balance a task force. For example, during WWII, carrier task groups might suffer more severe attrition in a single carrier air group, leaving an under-utilized support crew (which, unlike air crews, generally do not suffer casualties unless the ship itself is attacked). Re-distribution of air-group units allow the individual carriers in a group to better use the fixed assets of each ship (hangar space, maintenance crews, repair facilities, etc.). Alternately, a damaged fleet unit might disperse its air units to intact fleet units. For example, during the Battle of the Santa Cruz Islands, when the USS Hornet suffered critical damage, its surviving air group landed on USS Enterprise. In turn, when Enterprise suffered damage, part of its air group operated temporarily from Henderson field on Guadalcanal (though technically not a "deck") and contributed in the sinking of the battleship Hiei. Unplanned cross-decking often arose from aircraft in a critical fuel situation choosing any available landing place. Notably, during the aftermath of the Battle of the Philippine Sea, naval fliers returning at night with minimal fuel landed on whichever carrier in the task force was able to bring them in first, randomly scrambling the air groups throughout the carriers of the fleet.

In more recent times, NATO nations operating (or planning to operate) CATOBAR capable carriers have included design considerations for operation of friendly aircraft from member nations. The French Dassault Rafale has been able to be operated from U.S. carrier flight decks since 2010.

Marine infantry units are routinely cross-decked to and from amphibious warfare ships as part of expeditionary warfare missions. This may be a direct prelude to a landing operation or in a preliminary stage of a power projection mission as a show of force.

== Etymology ==
The origin of the term is obscure, but may refer to ships moored closely side-to-side at a dock or at anchor, since it is possible literally to go "across the decks" from ship to ship via gangplank without touching land. Cross-decking implies ship-to-ship transfer. Receiving personnel or supplies from shore usually would not be defined as "cross-decking". An exception to this rule might be personnel who only briefly come to shore who are then immediately reassigned to an outbound ship without an intervening shore assignment or leave. The implication of cross-decking in this case would be an immediate turn around from one assignment to another without pause.

== Historical usage ==
Ships while docked or underway could transfer personnel or supplies directly from ship to ship via small boats or via cables run between ships. This was often ad hoc and informal, or arising from expedient requirements in times of war. Or it could be part of a more formal replenishment operation at sea. With the development of aircraft (especially helicopters) the distances involved in cross-decking operations could be greatly increased with ships that were widely dispersed.

== Gallery ==
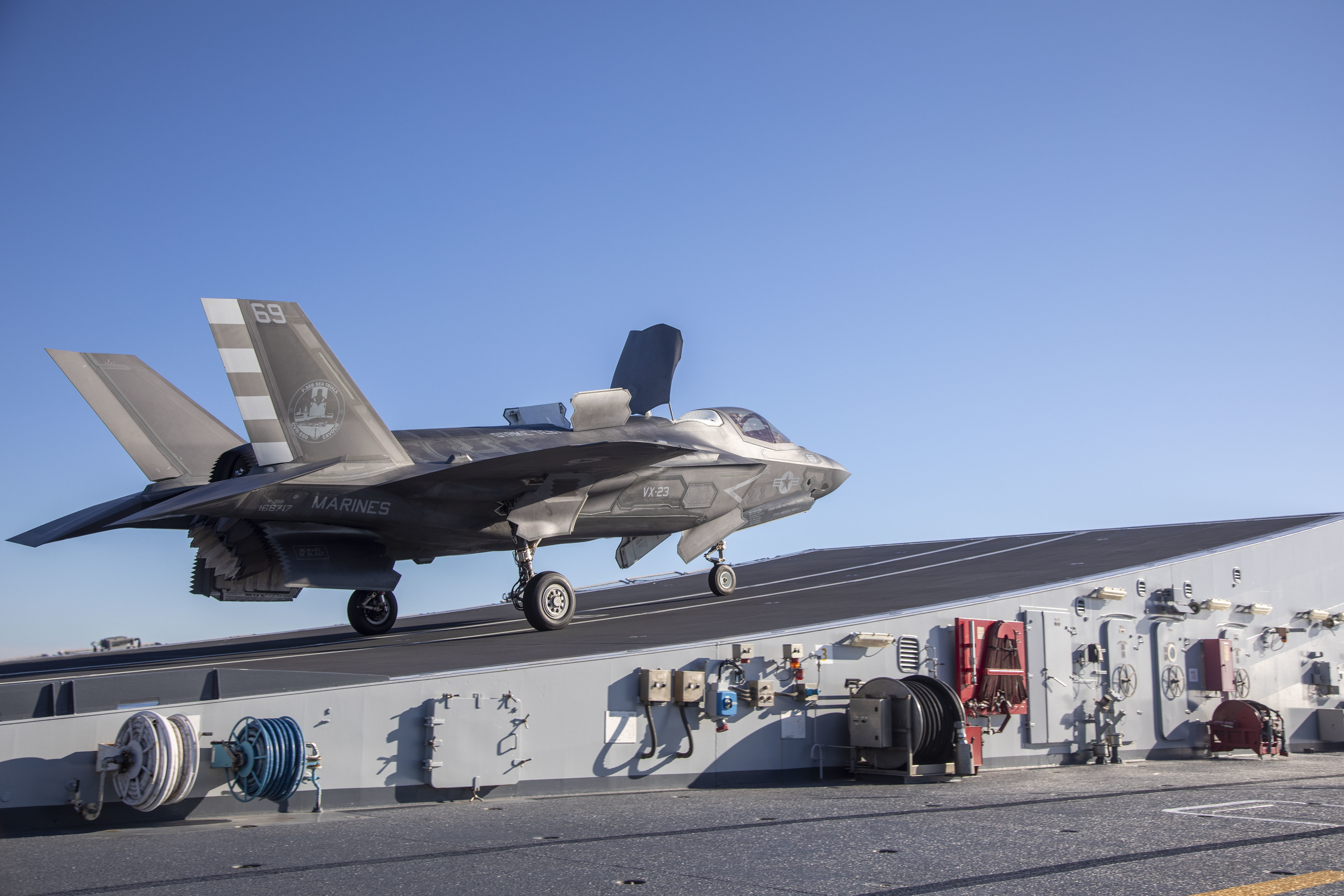
A USMC F-35B Lightning on the ski-jump of Cavour

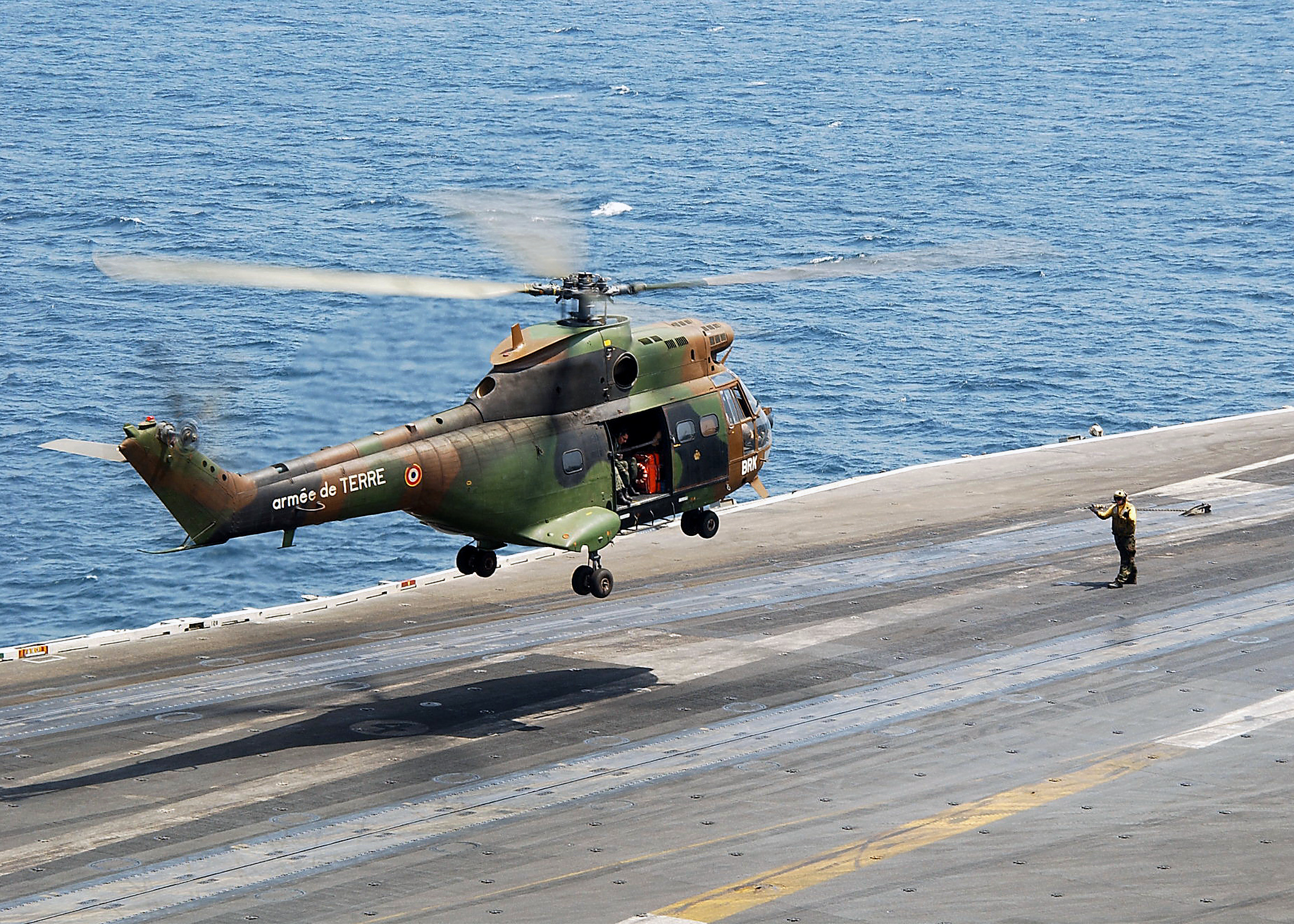
A French Army Light Aviation SA 330 Puma lands on USS George Washington

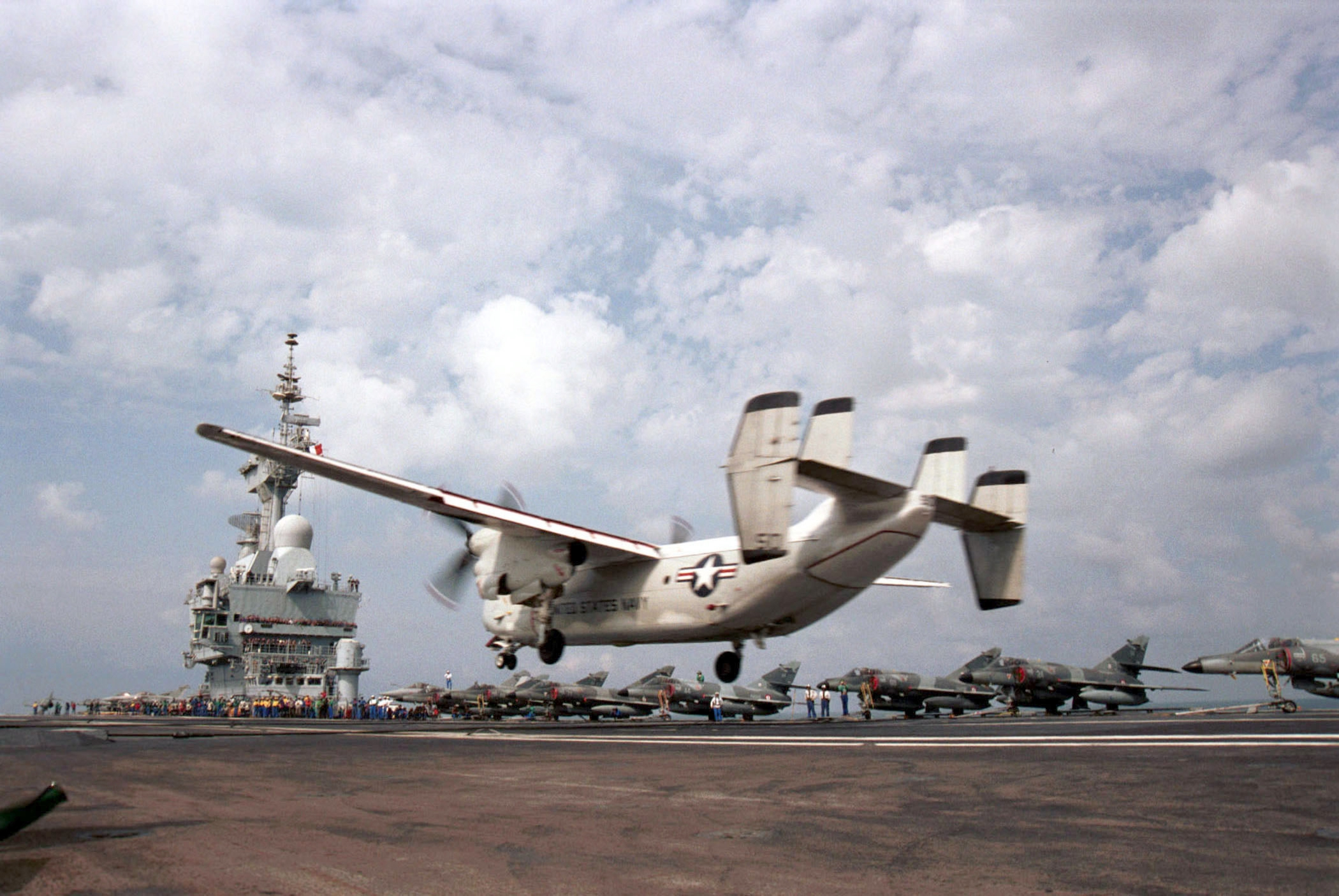
A US Navy C-2 Greyhound recovers aboard Charles de Gaulle

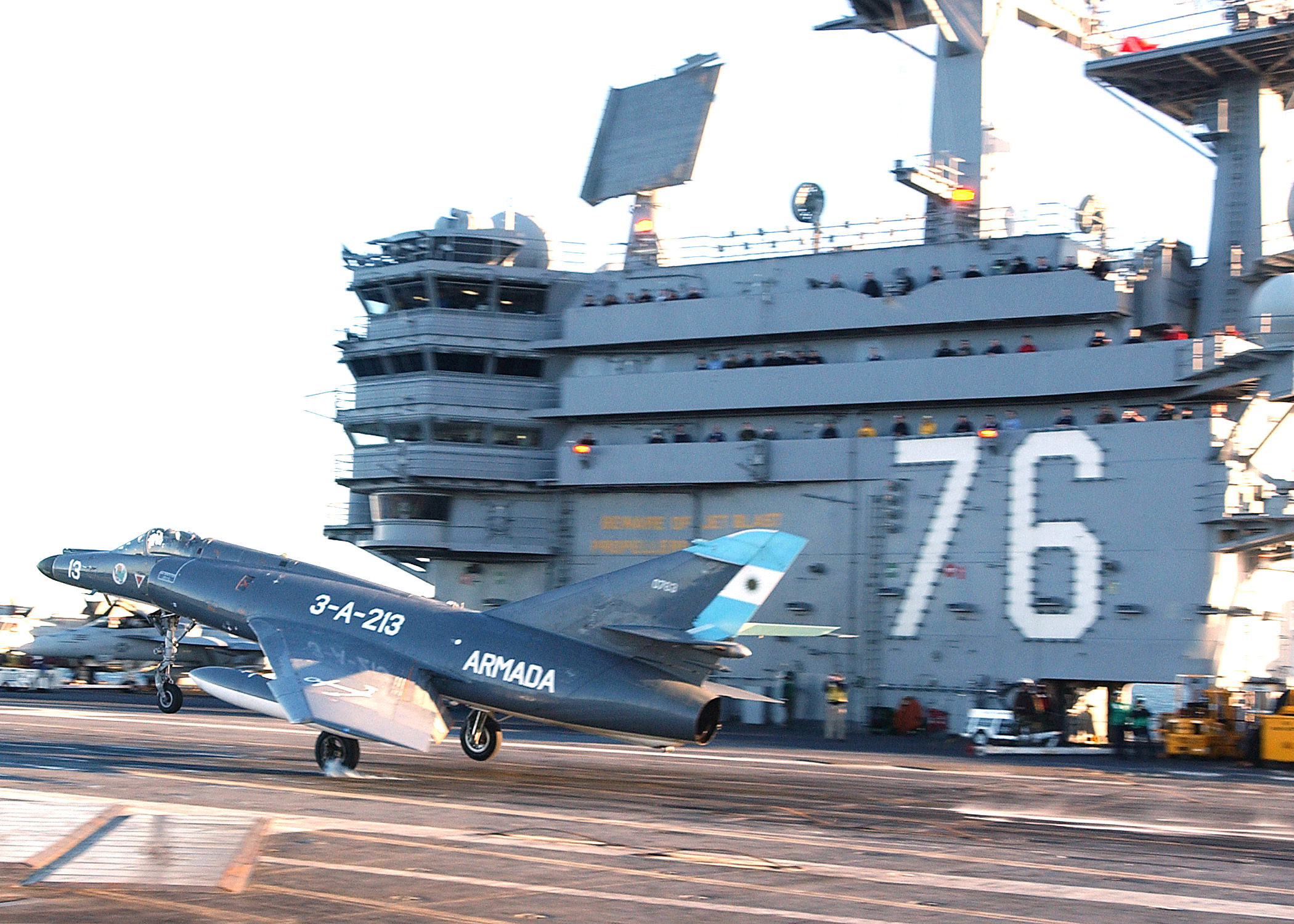
Argentine Navy Super Etendard on USS Ronald Reagan

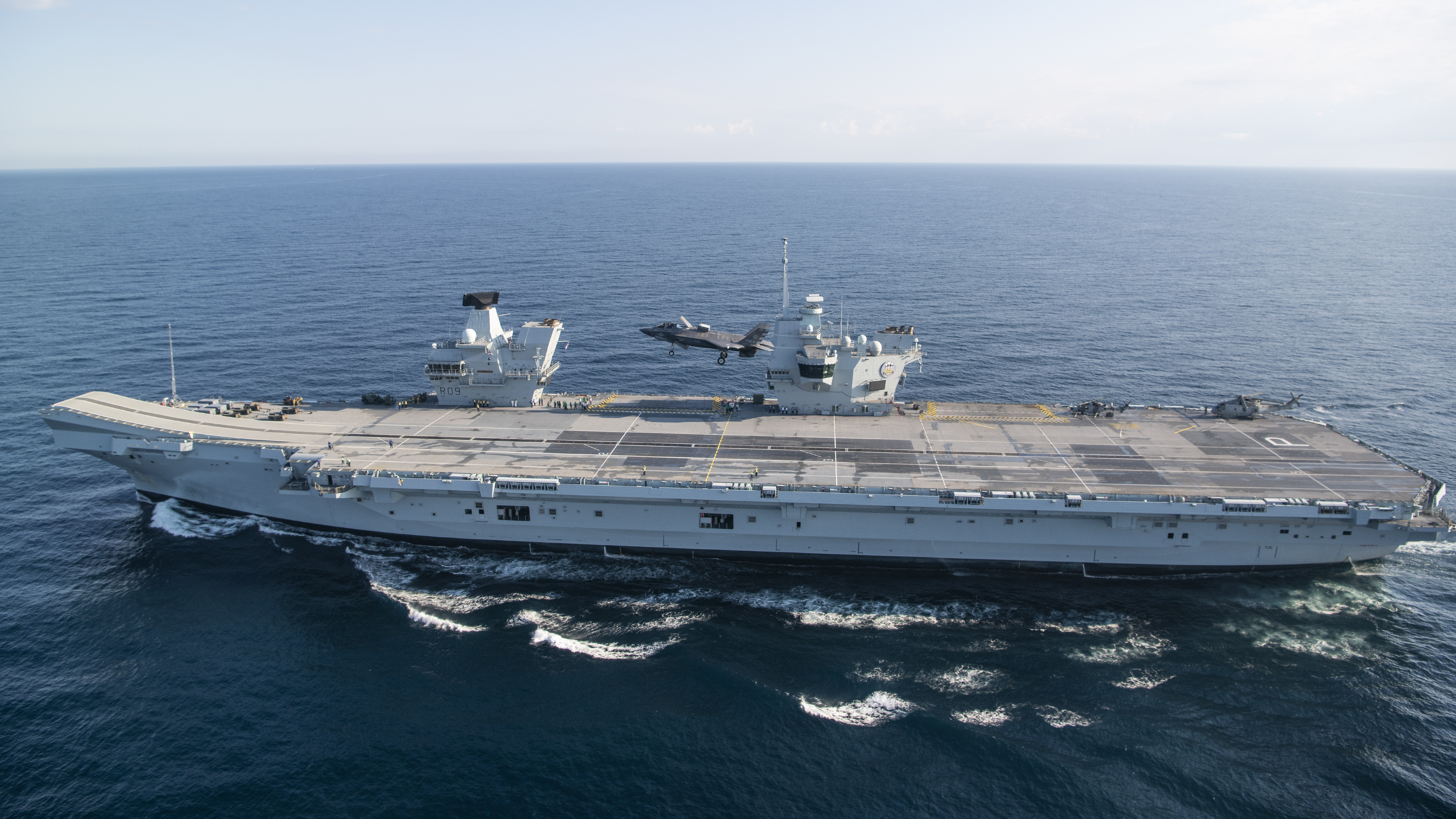
USMC F-35B lands on HMS Prince of Wales

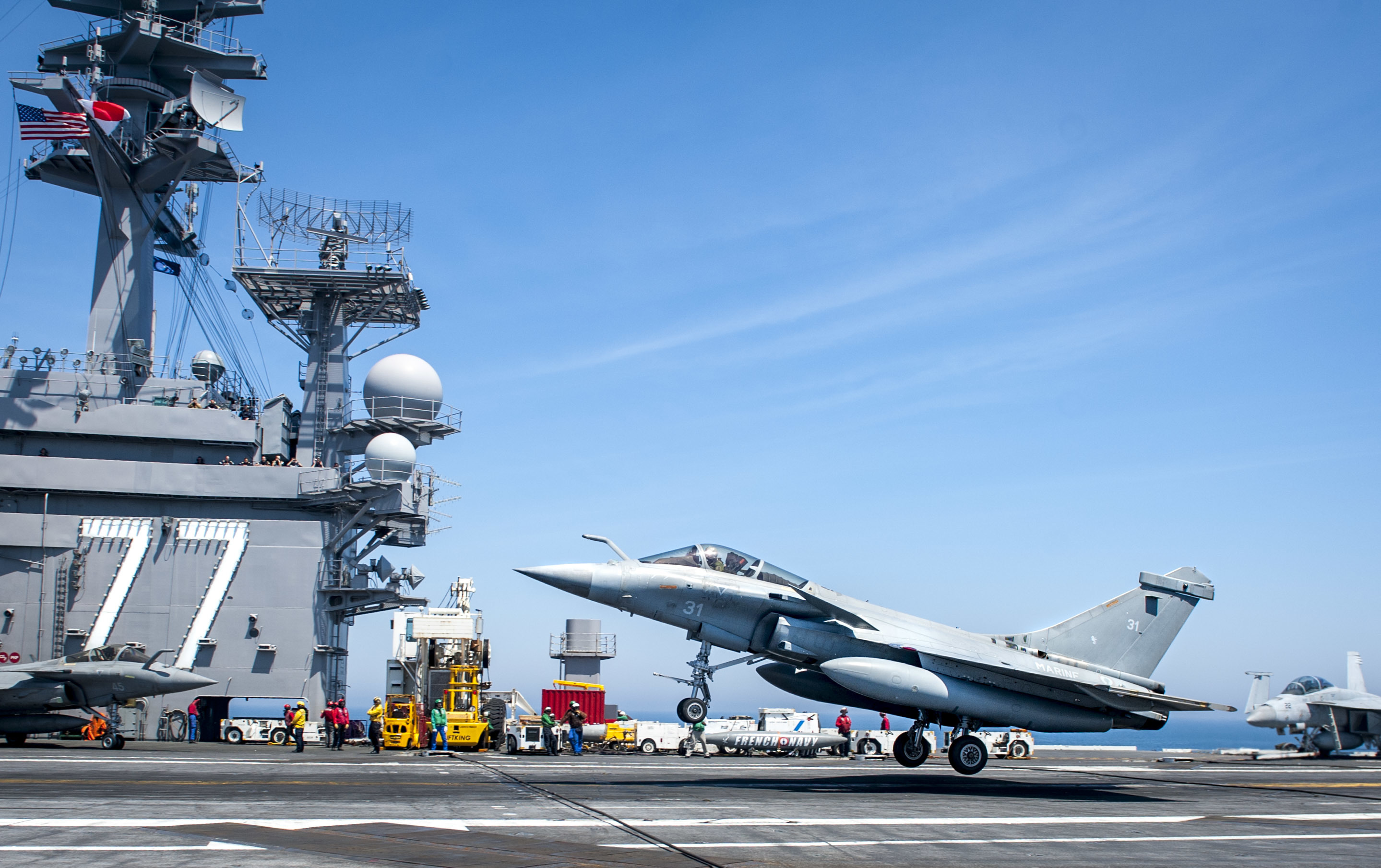
French Navy Dassault Rafale lands on USS George H. W. Bush

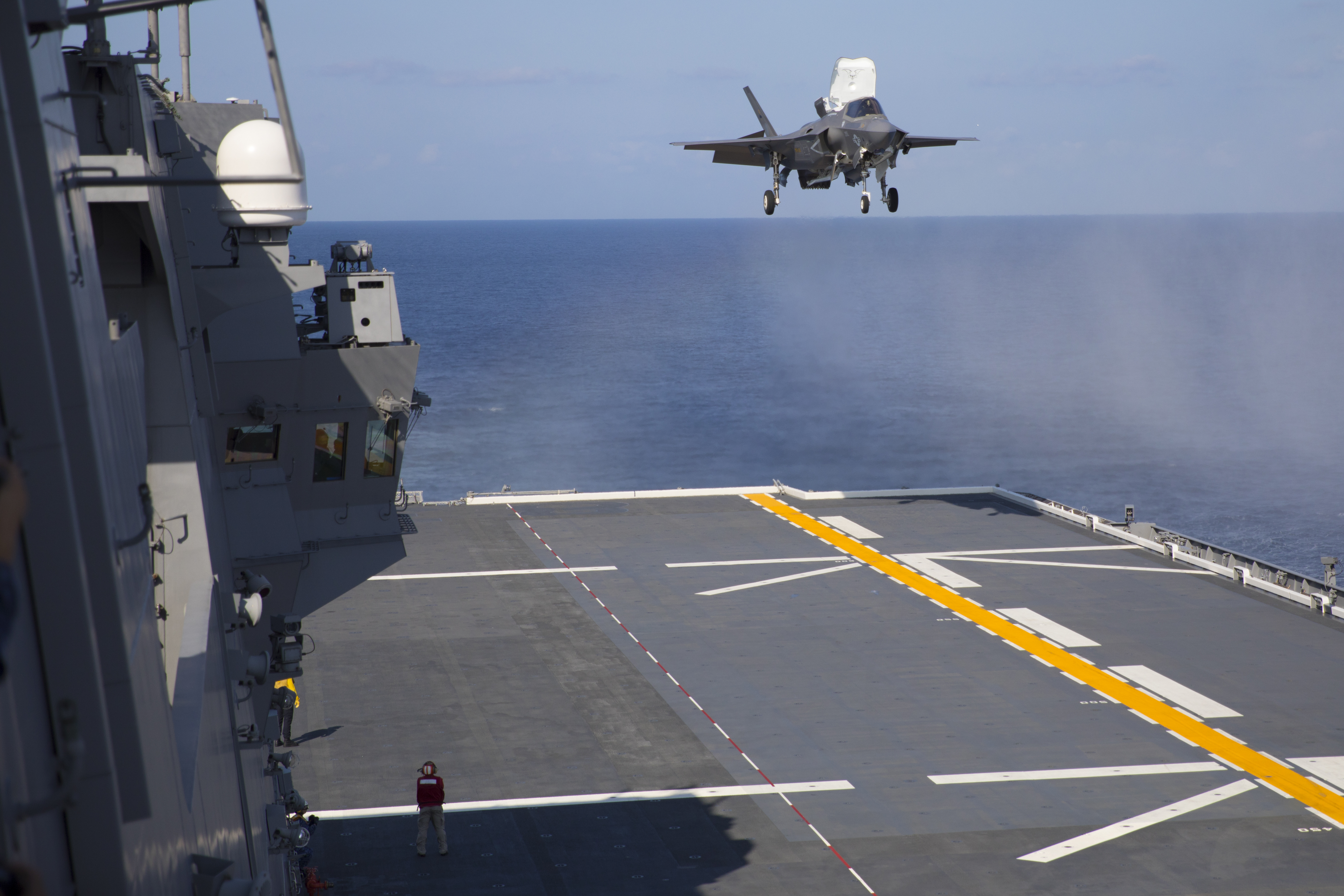
USMC F-35B lands on JS Izumo

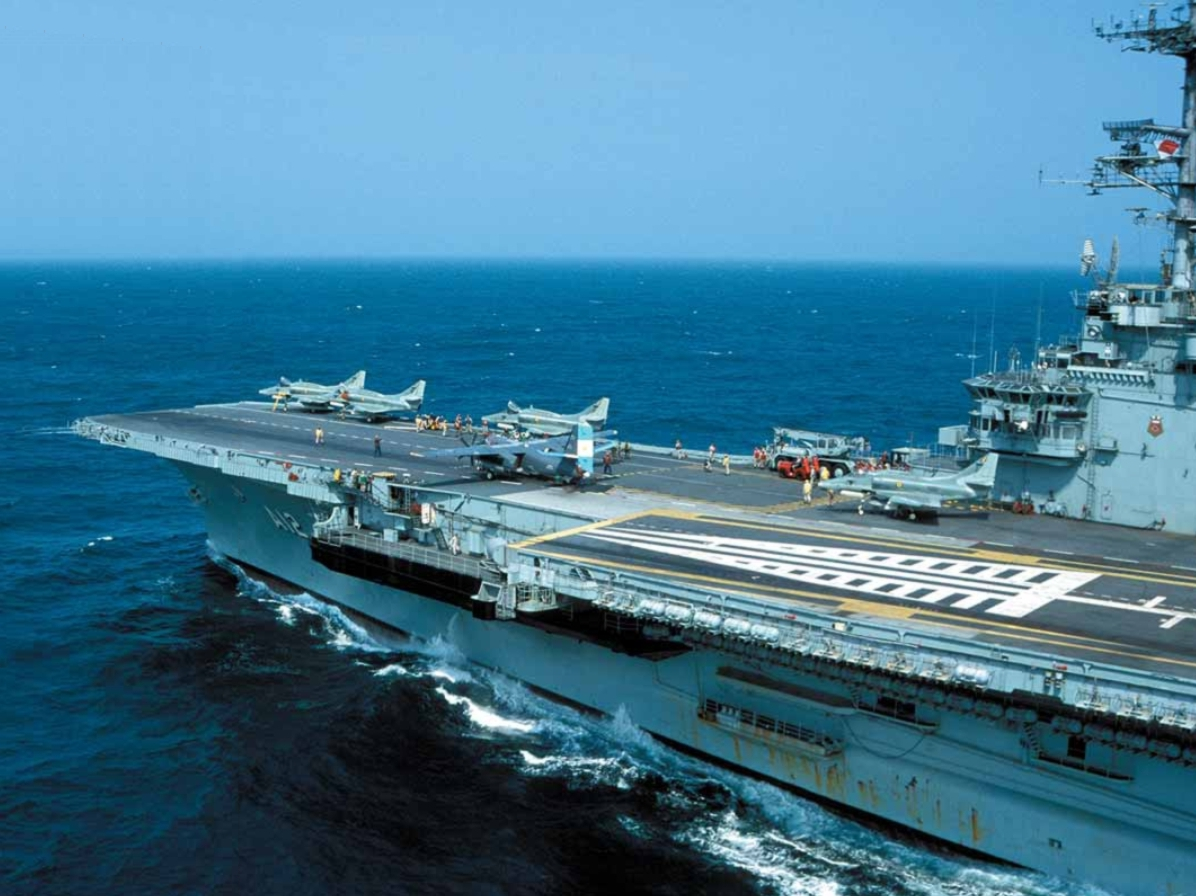
Argentine Navy S-2 Tracker on São Paulo

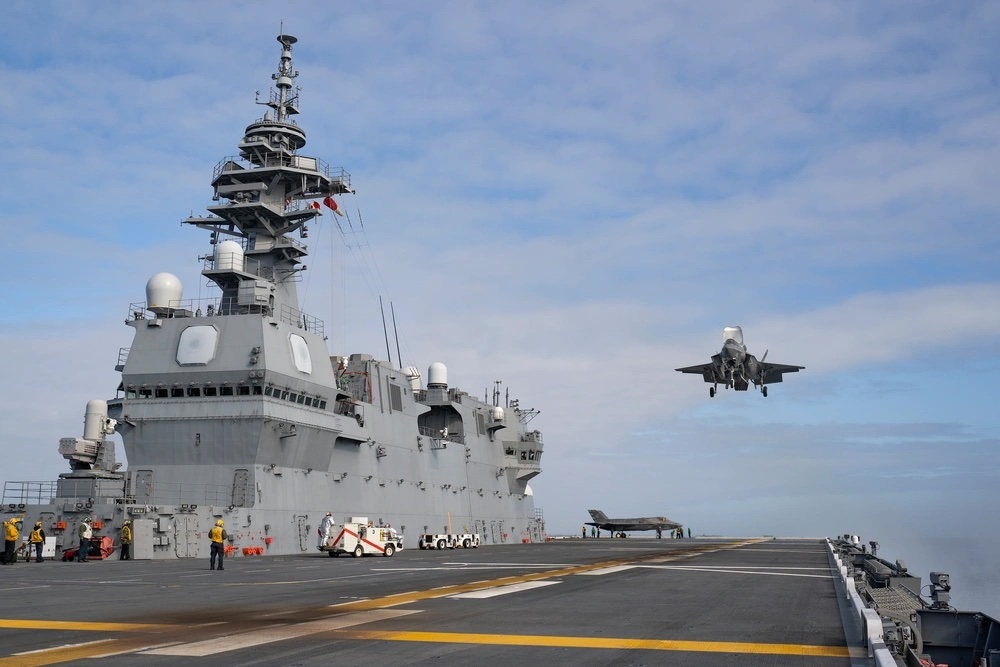
USMC F-35B lands on JS Kaga

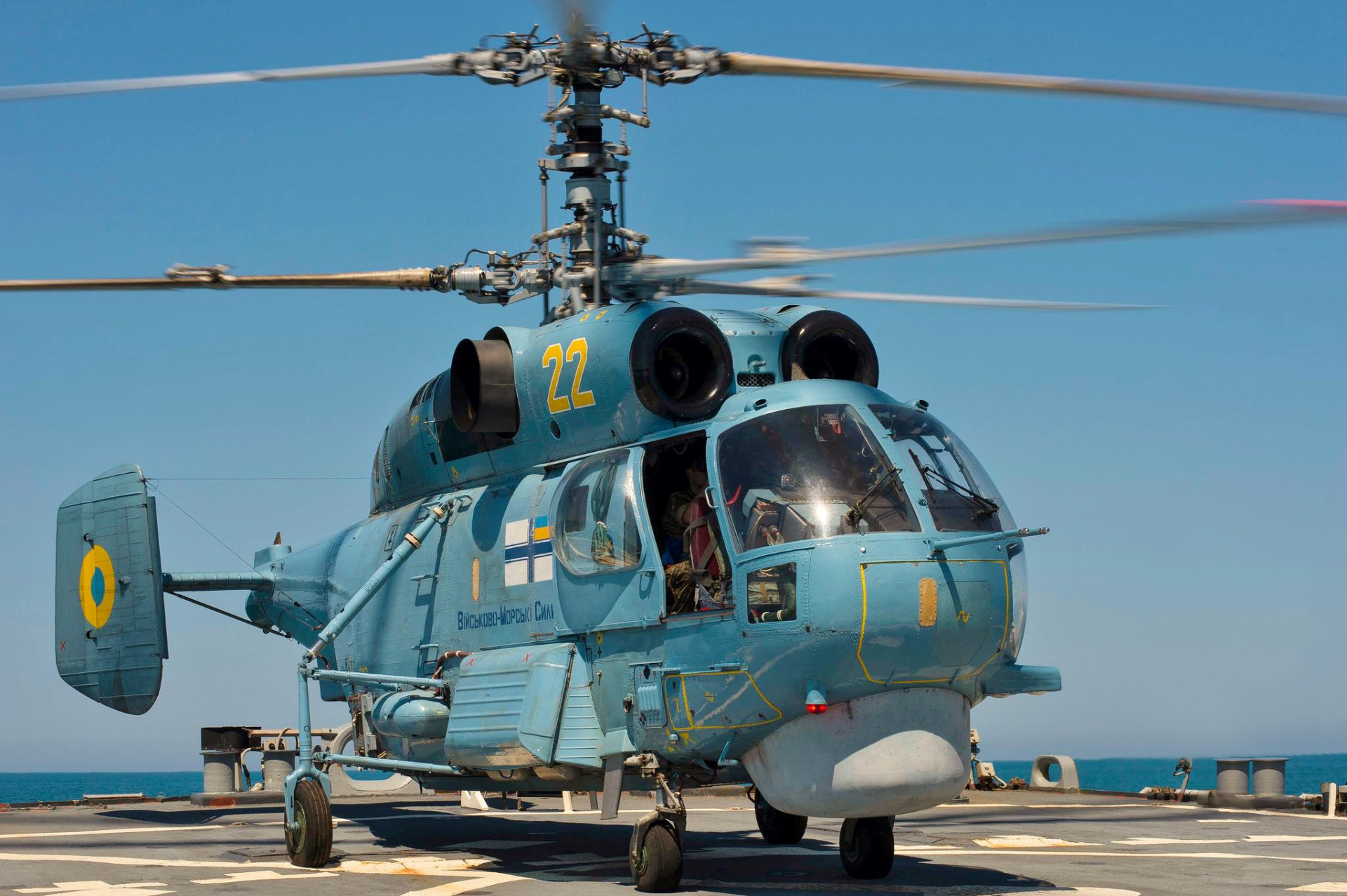
Ukrainian Navy Ka-27 lands on USS Donald Cook

US Navy F/A-18 Hornet launches from Charles de Gaulle

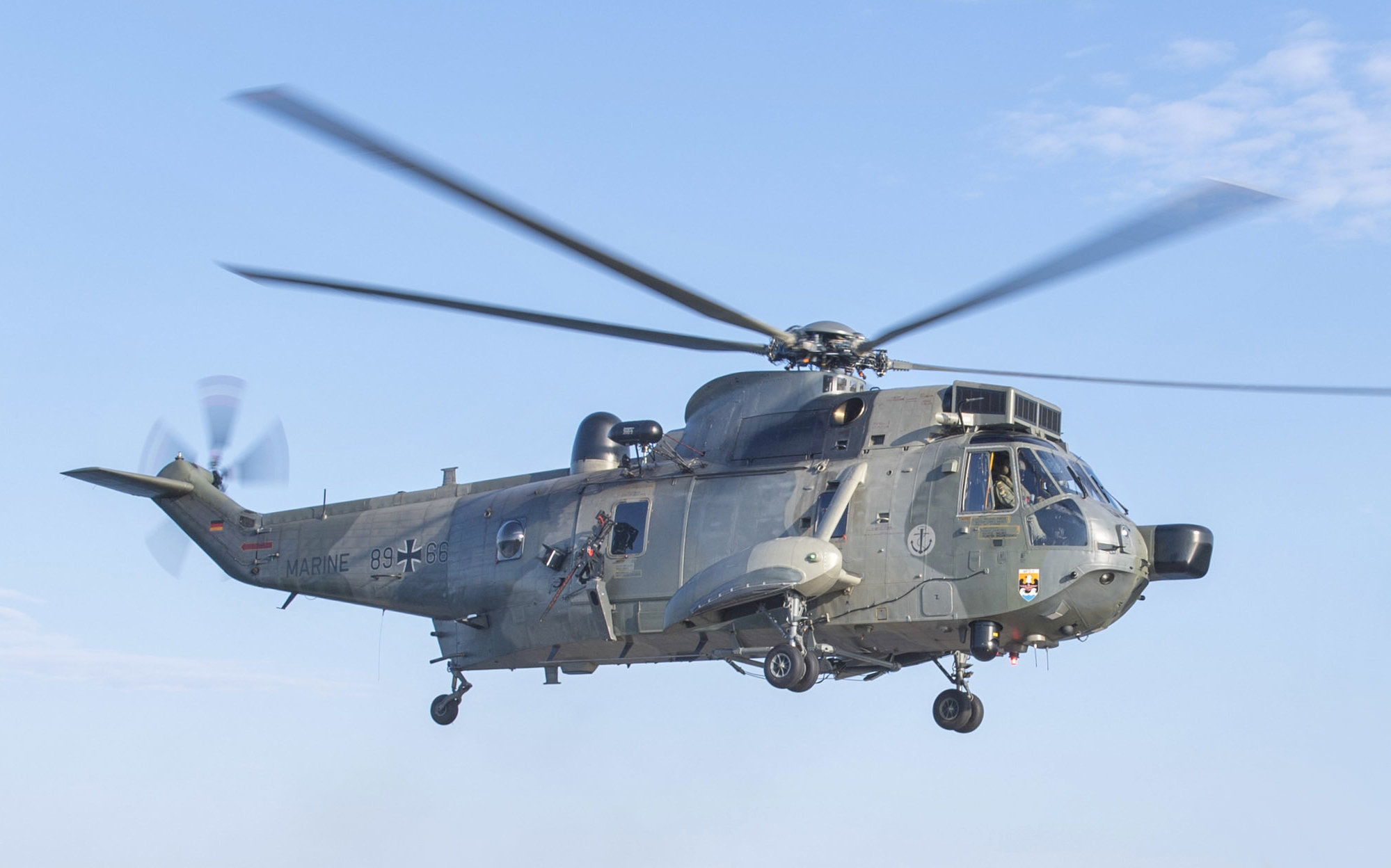
German Navy Westland Sea King takes off from USS Oak Hill

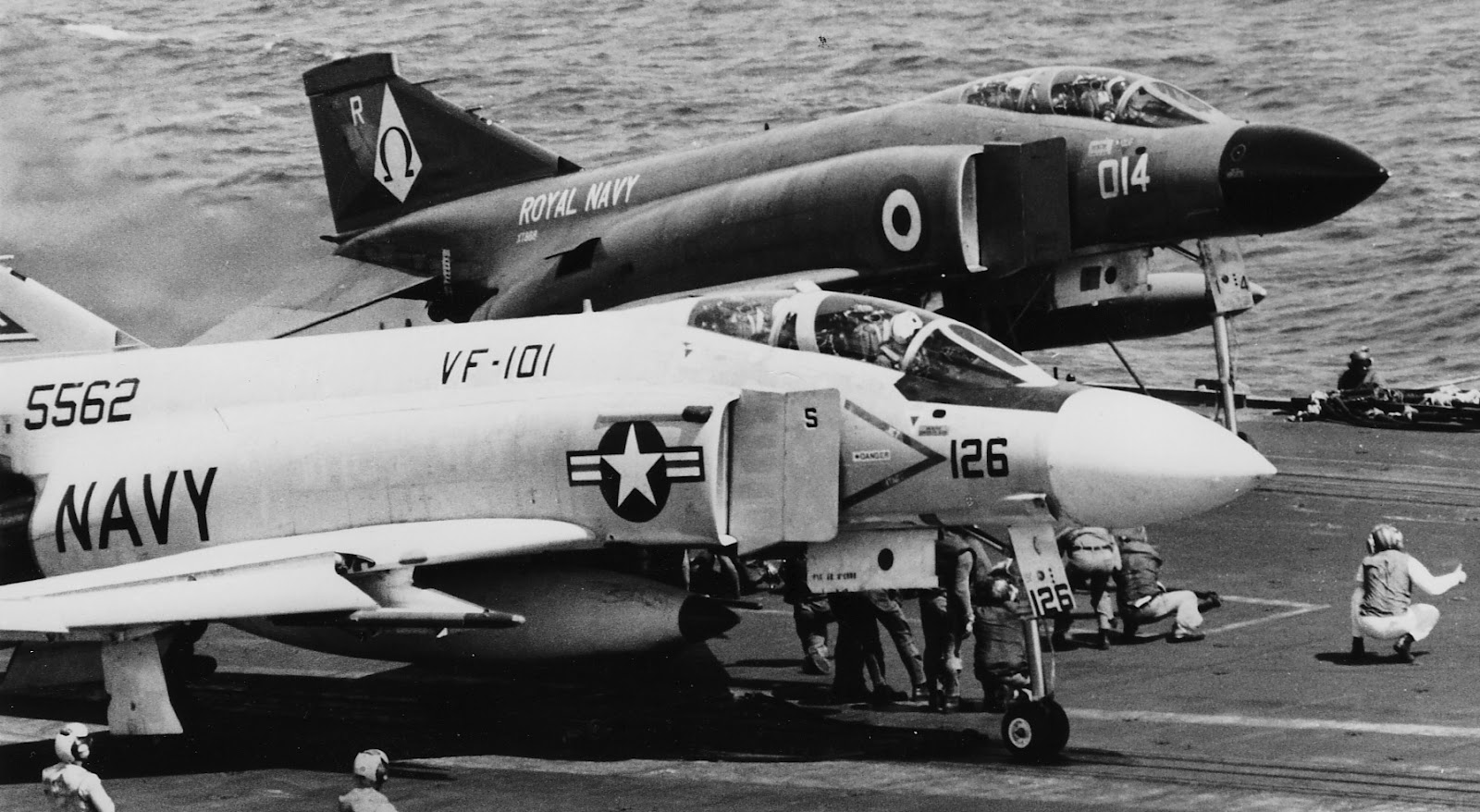
American & British F-4 Phantom II's prepare to launch from USS Independence

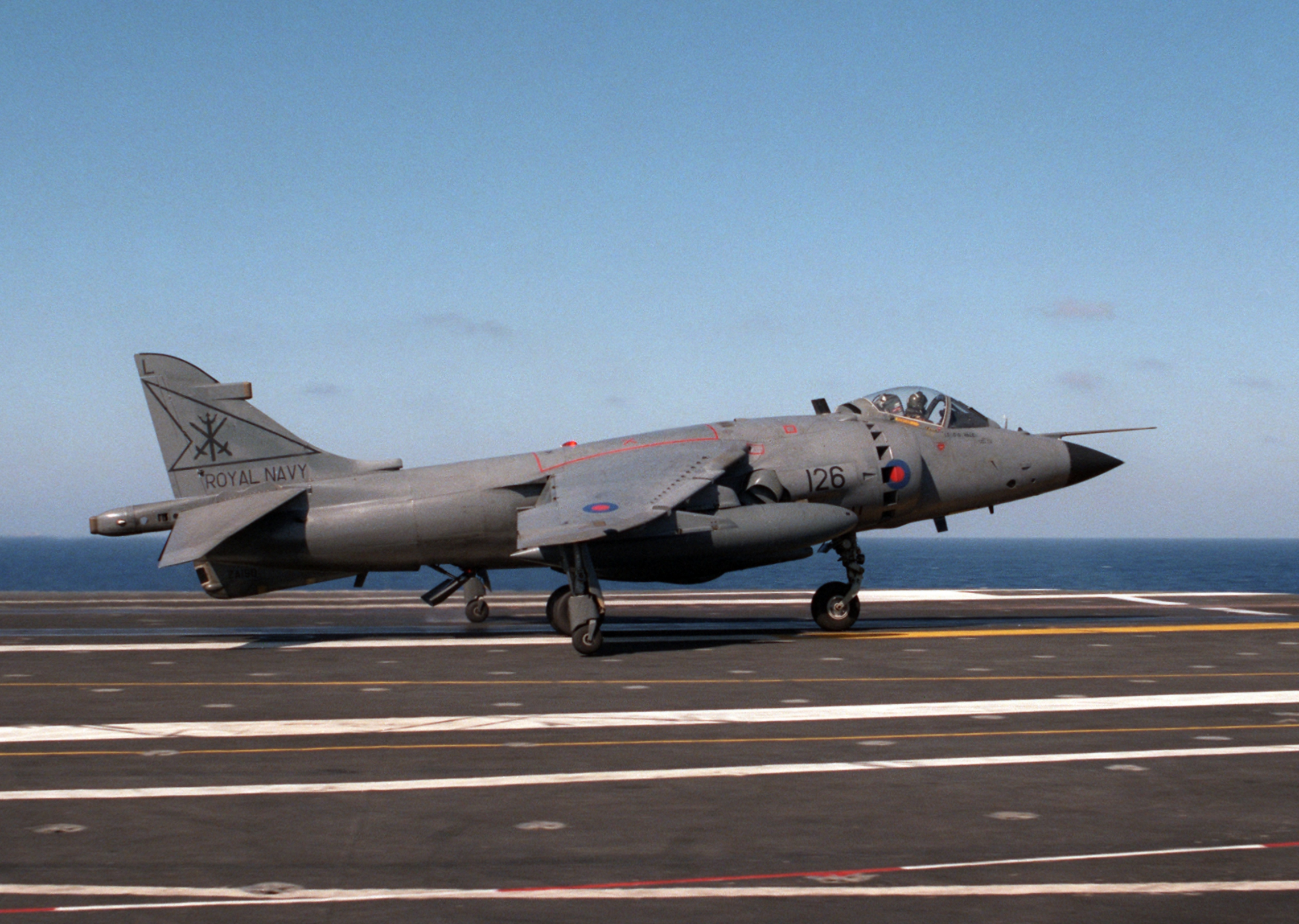
Royal Navy Sea Harrier takes off from USS Dwight D. Eisenhower

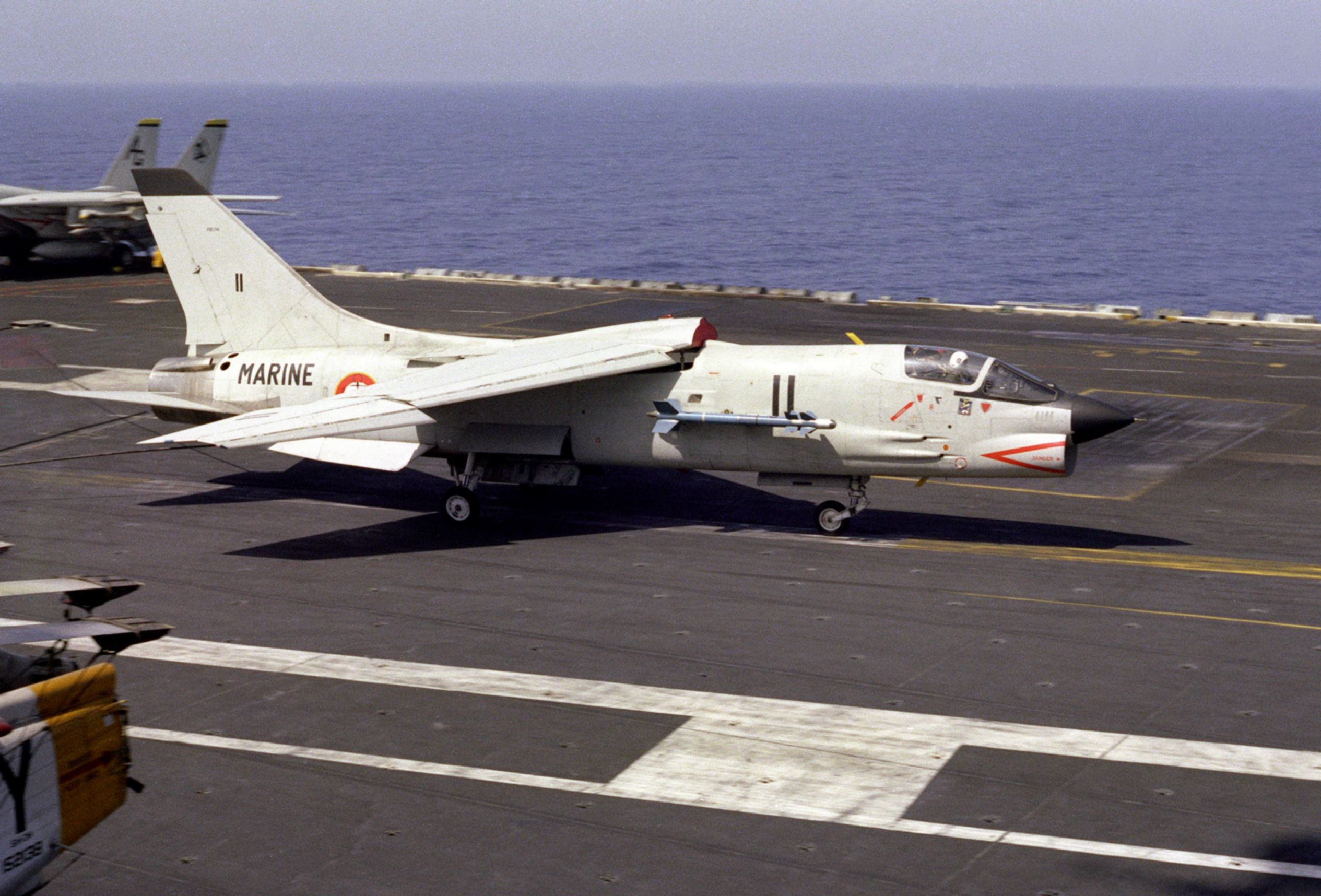
French Navy F-8 Crusader aboard USS Dwight D. Eisenhower

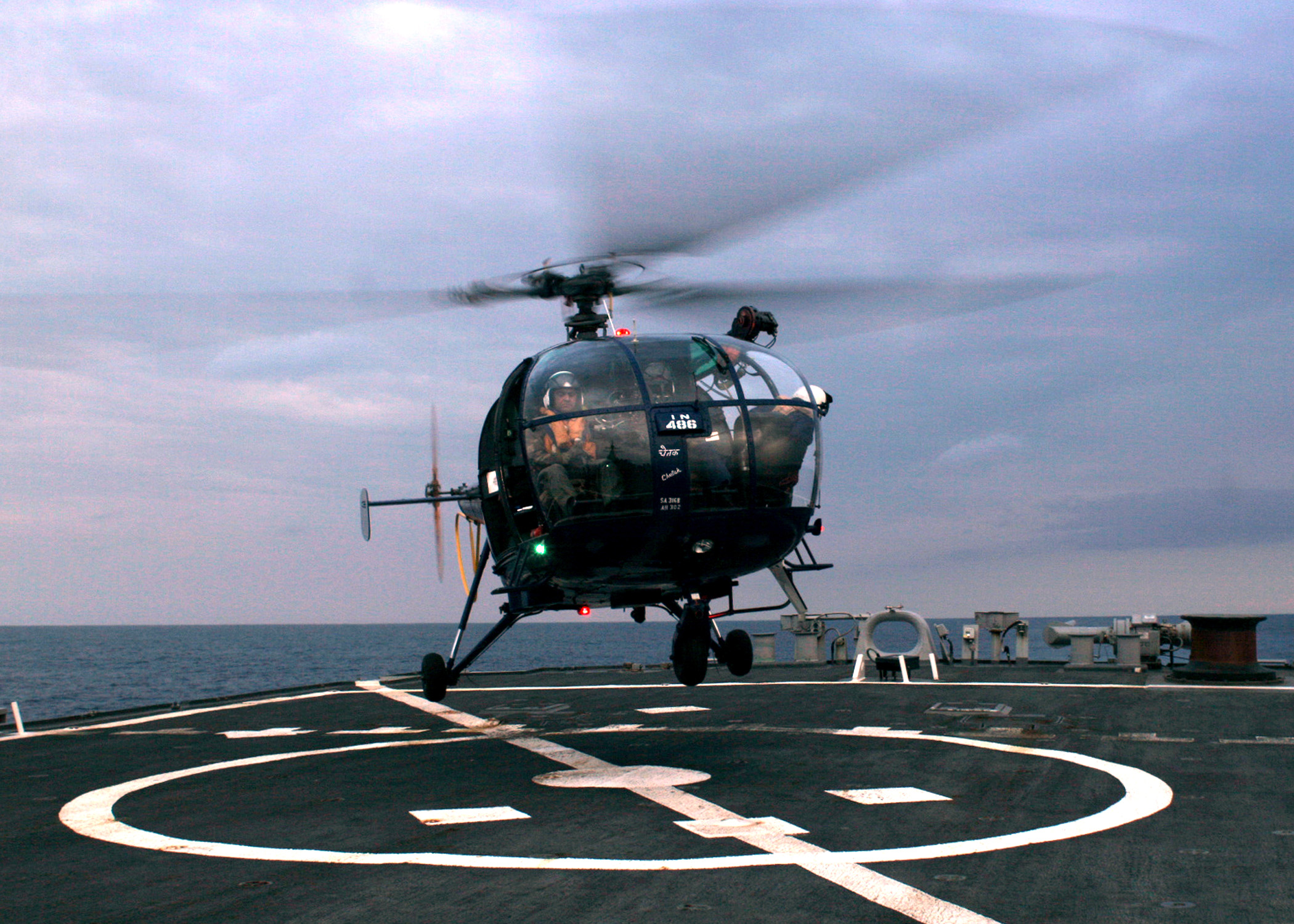
An HAL Chetak from Indian Navy destroyer INS Rana (D52) landing on USS Stethem (DDG-63) during Malabar 2007.

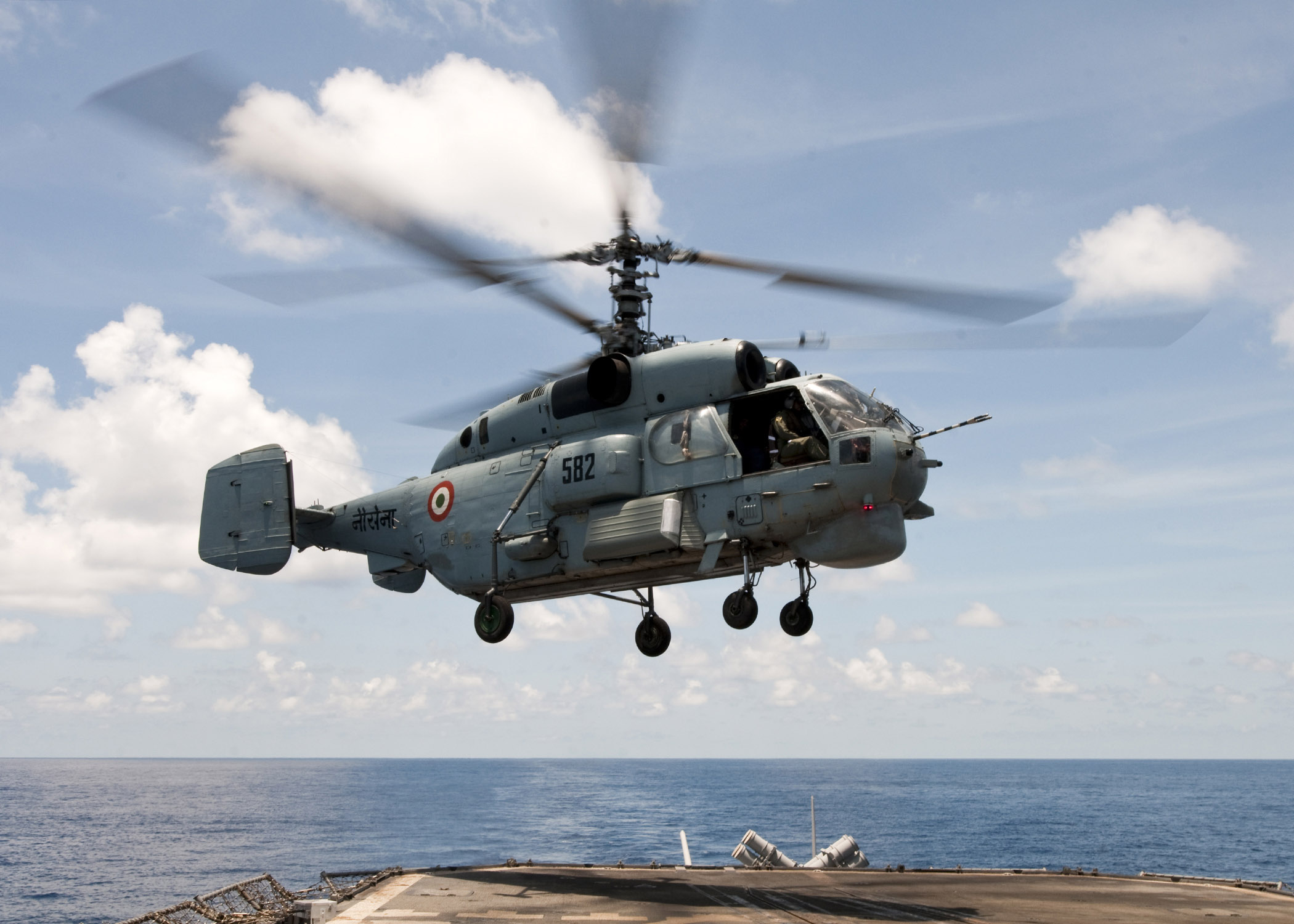
A Kamov Ka-31 from Indian carrier INS Viraat (R22) preparing to land on USS Bunker Hill (CG-52) during Malabar 2012.

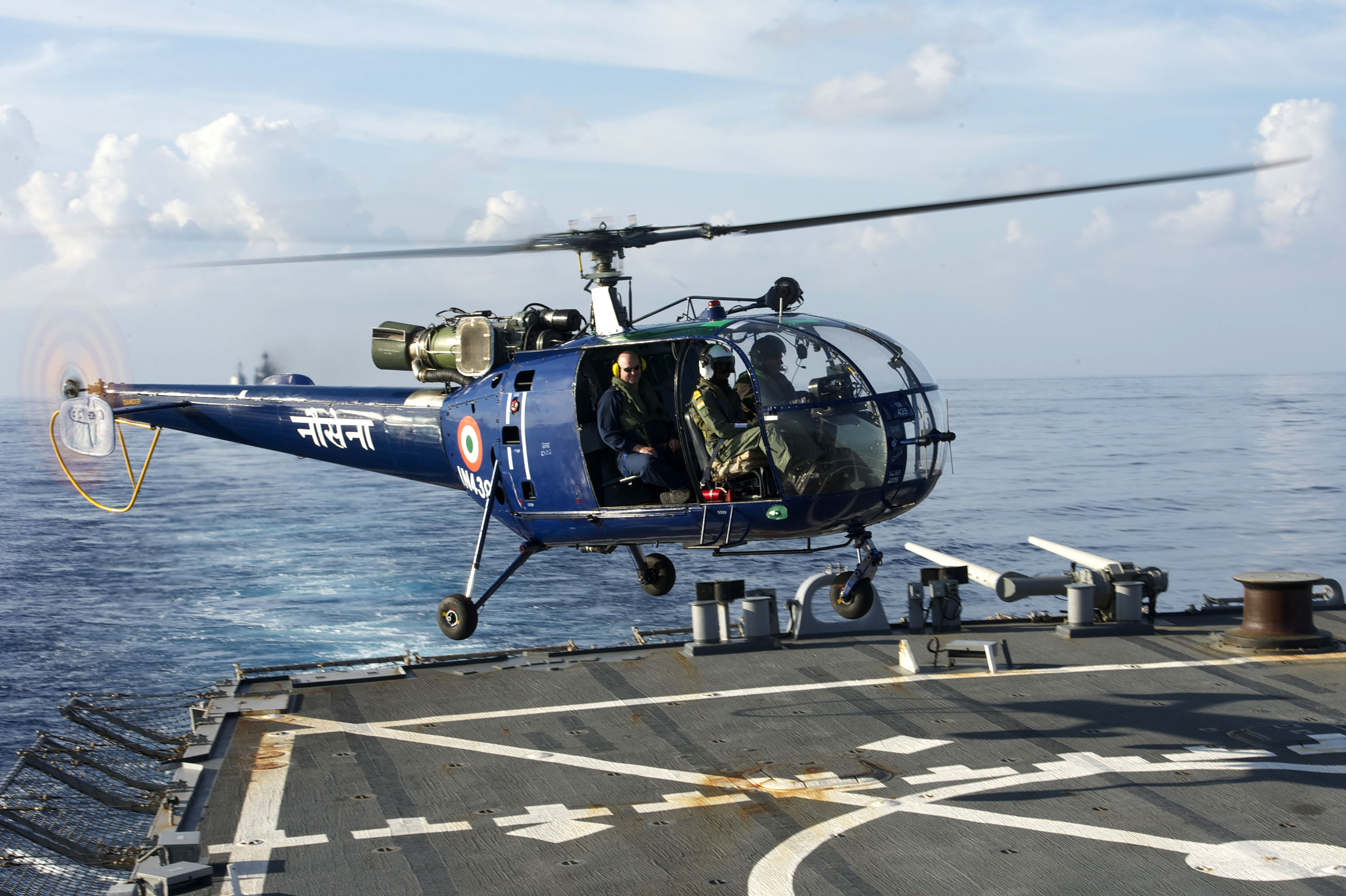
A Chetak from Indian frigate INS Shivalik (F47) landing on USS John S. McCain (DDG-56) during Malabar 2014.

== Sources ==
- Navy.mil: ESG 3 Proves Flexibility, Mobility with First Staff Cross Deck at Sea
- DEFENSETECH Cross Deck Operations
