= Marcus A. Hitchcock =

U.S. Navy rear admiral

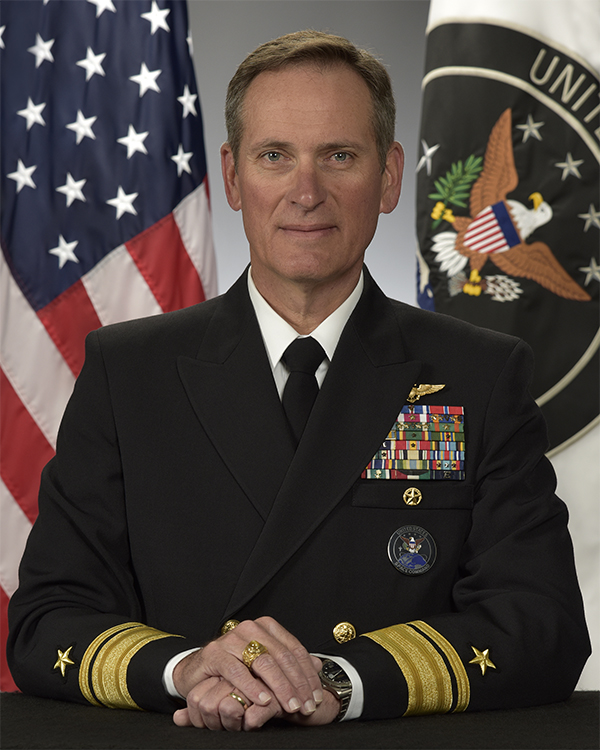
- Official portrait, 2019
- Born: 1963 (age 62–63); Utah, U.S.
- Spouse: Terri Lynn Westfall (m. 1990)
- Military career
- Allegiance: United States
- Branch: United States Navy
- Service years: 1985–2020
- Rank: Rear Admiral
- Commands: Navy Warfare Development Command; Carrier Strike Group 3 USS Dwight D. Eisenhower; USS Peleliu; VFA-32
- Conflicts: Gulf War; Iraq War
- Awards: Legion of Merit; Distinguished Flying Cross; Bronze Star Medal; Air Medal

Marcus Aurelius Hitchcock (born 1963) is a retired United States Navy rear admiral who last served as the director for strategy, plans, and policy of the United States Space Command. A naval aviator, he has commanded the Navy Warfare Development Command and Carrier Strike Group 3.

== Early life and education ==
Raised in Salt Lake City, Utah, Hitchcock graduated from Brighton High School in 1981. He then attended the United States Naval Academy, graduating in 1985 with a B.S. degree in ocean engineering. He also attended the Naval War College and Armed Forces Staff College.

== Military career ==
Hitchcock received his commission in the United States Navy in 1985 after graduating from the United States Naval Academy. He was designated a naval aviator in 1987.

In September 2017, Hitchcock took command of the Navy Warfare Development Command. While in command, he was nominated for promotion to rear admiral. From June 2019 to August 2020, he served as the director of plans and policy of the newly established United States Space Command. This was his last assignment before retiring from active duty.

== Personal life ==
Hitchcock married Terri Lynn Westfall on May 19, 1990 in Oak Harbor, Washington.

== Dates of promotion ==
Rank	Date
Rear Admiral (lower half)	March 1, 2014
Rear Admiral	2018

Military offices
Preceded by Ronald A. Boxall	Commander of Carrier Strike Group 3; 2016–2017	Succeeded by Michael A. Wettlaufer
Preceded by Bret Batchelder	Commander of the Navy Warfare Development Command; 2017–2019	Succeeded by John F. Meier
New office	Director for Plans of Policy of the United States Space Command; 2019–2020	Succeeded by Michael D. Bernacchi Jr.
