= USS Gerald R. Ford =

Gerald R. Ford–class aircraft carrier

USS Gerald R. Ford (CVN-78)
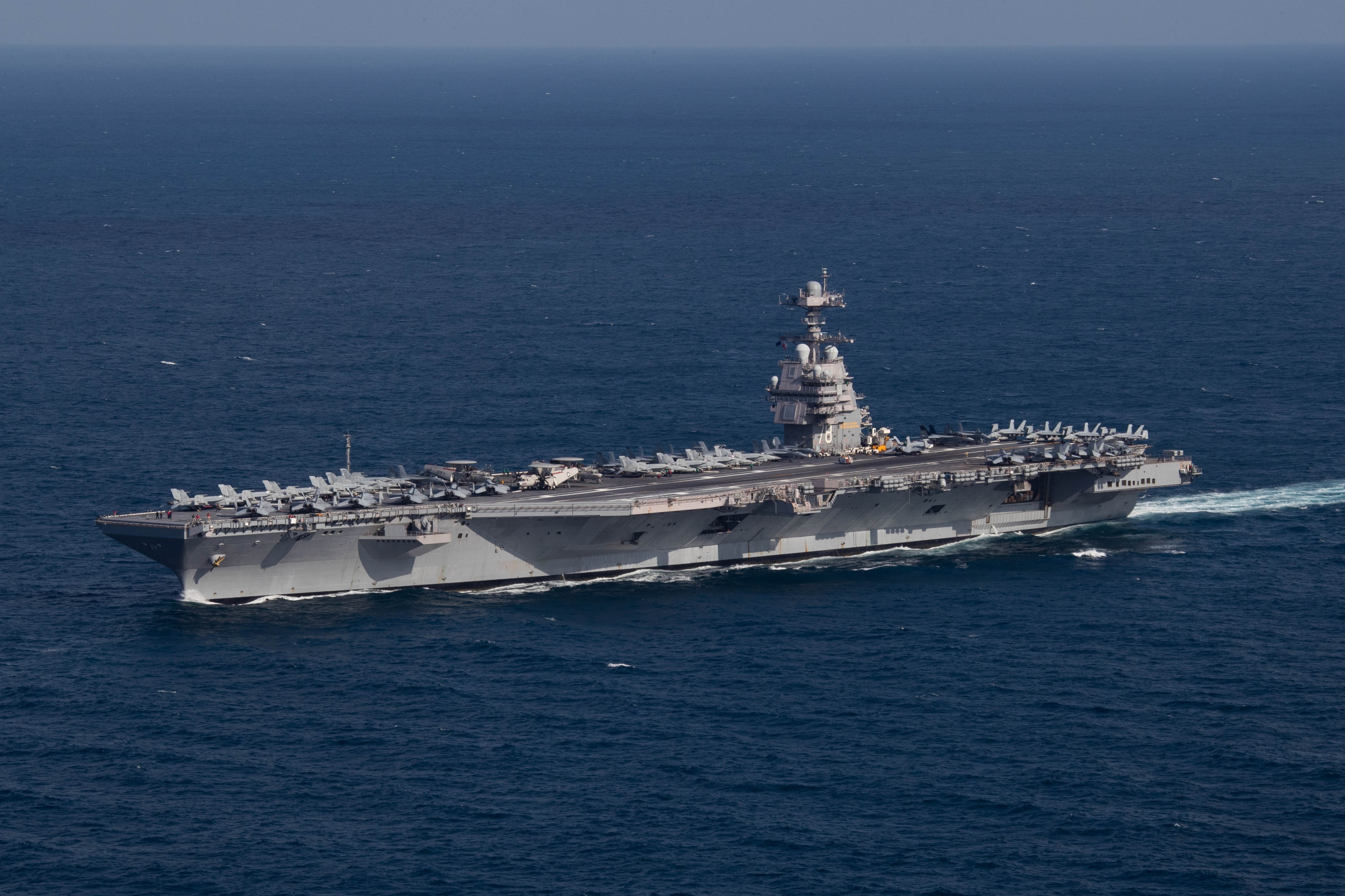
- USS Gerald R. Ford (CVN-78) after departing Naval Station Norfolk, Virginia in October 2022

History

United States
- Name: Gerald R. Ford
- Namesake: Gerald R. Ford
- Awarded: 10 September 2008
- Builder: Newport News Shipbuilding
- Cost: $12.8 billion + $4.7 billion R&D (estimated)
- Laid down: 14 November 2009
- Launched: 11 October 2013
- Sponsored by: Susan Ford
- Christened: 9 November 2013
- Acquired: 31 May 2017
- Commissioned: 22 July 2017
- Home port: Norfolk, Virginia
- Motto: Integrity at the helm
- Status: in active service
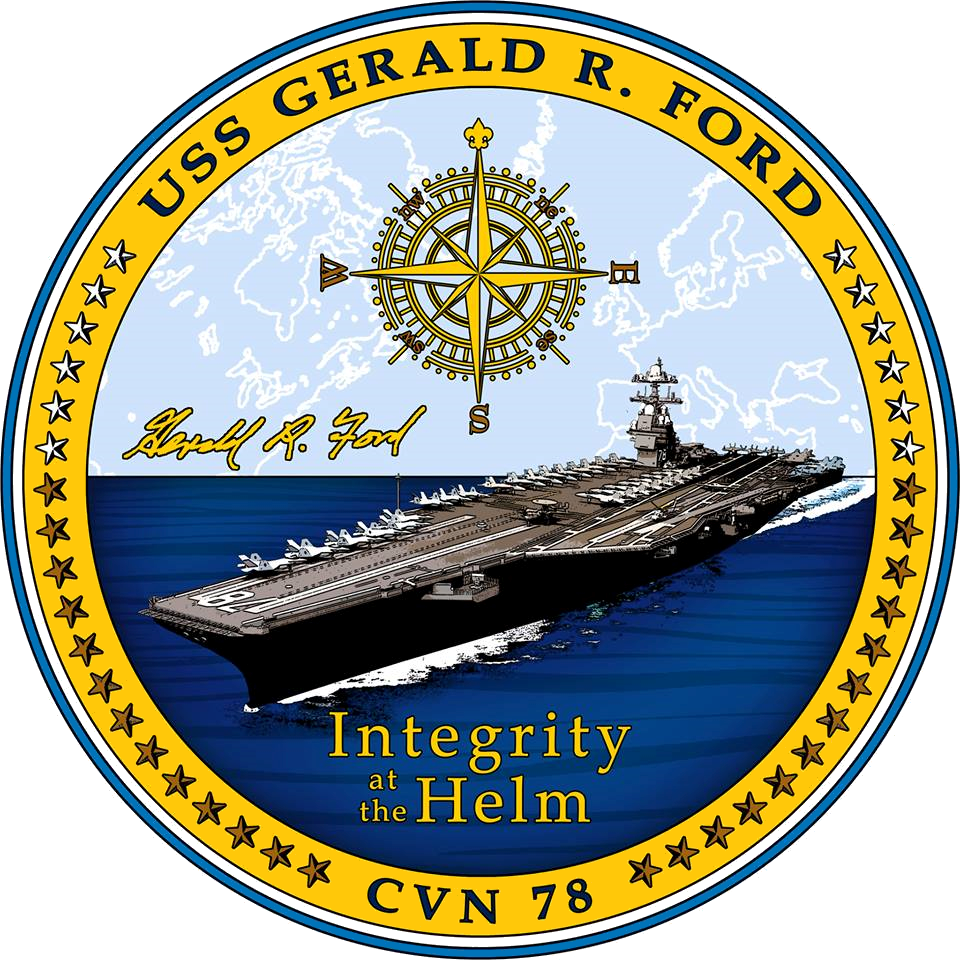
- Badge

General characteristics
- Class & type: Gerald R. Ford-class aircraft carrier
- Displacement: About 100,000 long tons (100,000 tonnes) (full load)
- Length: 1,106 ft (337 m)
- Beam: 134 ft (41 m) (waterline); 256 ft (78 m) (flight deck)
- Height: 250 ft (76 m)
- Draft: 39 ft (12 m)
- Decks: 25
- Installed power: Two Bechtel A1B PWR nuclear reactors, HEU 93.5%
- Propulsion: Four shafts
- Speed: In excess of 30 knots (56 km/h; 35 mph)
- Range: ≈25 years before mid-life refuel
- Complement: 4,539 (including air wing)
- Sensors & processing systems: AN/SPY-3 Multi-Function Radar (MFR) X band active electronically scanned array; AN/SPY-4 Volume Search Radar (VSR) S band active electronically scanned array
- Armament: Surface-to-air missiles: 2 × RIM-162 ESSM launchers; 2 × RIM-116 RAM; Guns: 3 × Phalanx CIWS; 4 × Mk 38 25 mm Machine Gun Systems; 4 × M2 .50 Cal. (12.7 mm) machine guns
- Aircraft carried: 75+
- Aviation facilities: 1,092 × 256 ft (333 × 78 m) flight deck

USS Gerald R. Ford (CVN-78) is an aircraft carrier of the United States Navy and the lead ship of her class. The ship is named after the 38th president of the United States, Gerald Ford, whose World War II naval service included combat duty aboard the light aircraft carrier Monterey in the Pacific Theater.

Construction began on 11 August 2005, when Northrop Grumman held a ceremonial steel cut for a 15-ton plate that forms part of a side shell unit of the carrier. The keel of Gerald R. Ford was laid down on 14 November 2009. She was christened on 9 November 2013. Gerald R. Ford entered the fleet, replacing the decommissioned USS Enterprise (CVN-65), which ended her 51 years of active service in December 2012.

Originally scheduled for delivery in 2015, Gerald R. Ford was delivered to the Navy on 31 May 2017 and formally commissioned by President Donald Trump on 22 July 2017. She departed Naval Station Norfolk on her first deployment on 2 May 2023. When she was commissioned she was the world's largest aircraft carrier and the largest warship ever constructed.

== Naming ==
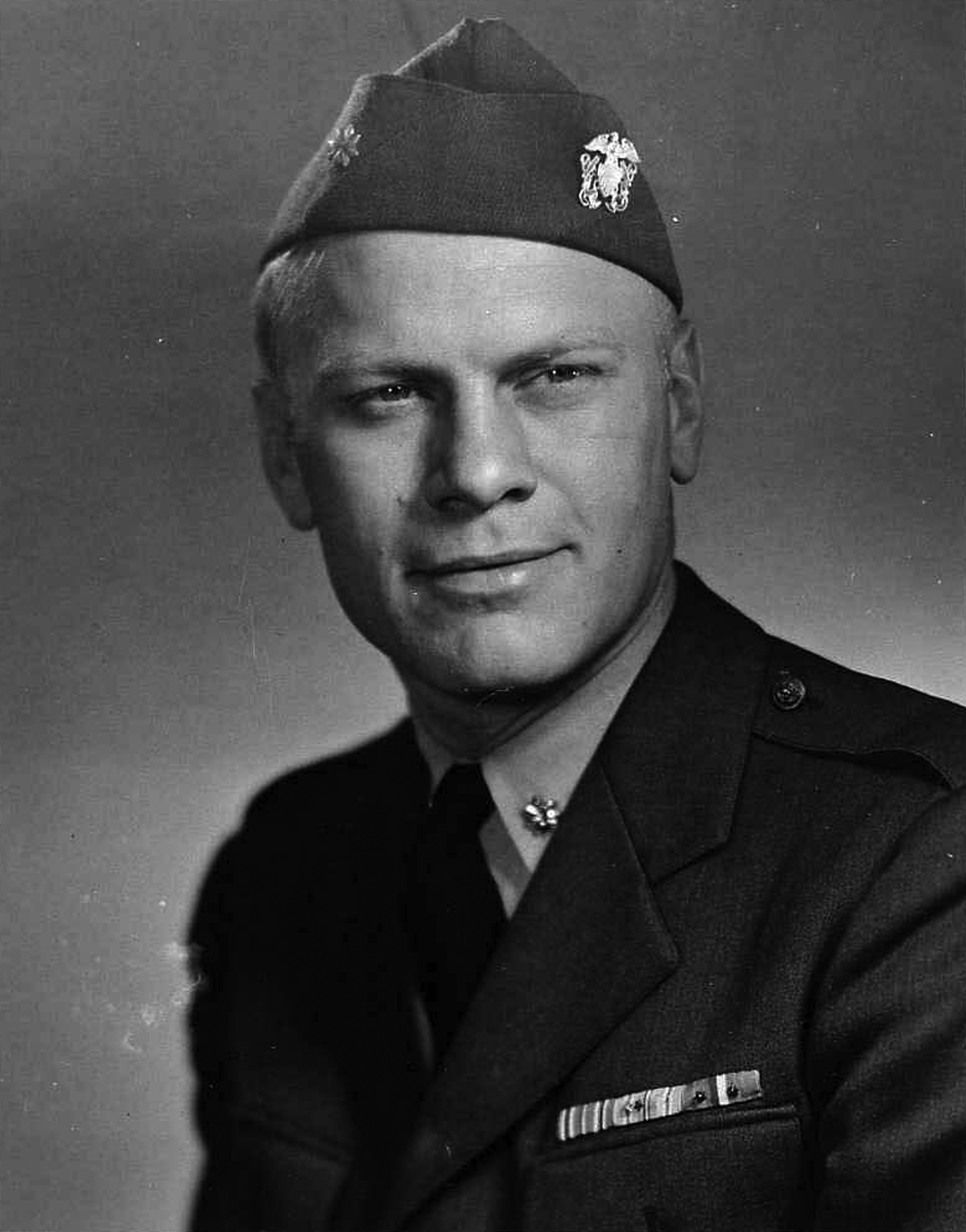
Ford in his U.S. Navy uniform, c. 1945

In 2006, while Gerald Ford was still alive, Senator John Warner of Virginia proposed to amend a 2007 defense-spending bill to declare that CVN-78 "shall be named the USS Gerald Ford." The final version, signed by President George W. Bush on 17 October 2006, declared only that it "is the sense of Congress that ... CVN-78 should be named the U.S.S. Gerald R. Ford". Since such "sense of" language is typically non-binding and does not carry the force of law, the Navy was not required to name the ship after Ford.

On 3 January 2007, former United States secretary of defense Donald Rumsfeld announced that the aircraft carrier would be named after Ford during a eulogy for President Ford at Grace Episcopal Church in East Grand Rapids, Michigan. Rumsfeld indicated that he had personally told Ford of the honor during a visit to his home in Rancho Mirage a few weeks before Ford's death. This makes the aircraft carrier one of the few U.S. ships named after a living person. Later in the day, the Navy confirmed that the aircraft carrier would indeed be named after the former president. On 16 January 2007, Navy secretary Donald Winter officially named CVN-78 USS Gerald R. Ford. Ford's daughter Susan Ford Bales was named the ship's sponsor. The announcements were made at a Pentagon ceremony attended by Vice President Dick Cheney, Senators Warner (R-VA) and Levin (D-MI), Major General Guy C. Swan III, Bales, Ford's other three children, and others.

The USS America Carrier Veterans Association (CVA) had pushed to name the ship USS America. The CVA is an association of sailors who served aboard USS America (CV-66). The carrier was decommissioned in 1996 and scuttled in 2005 in the Atlantic, as part of a damage test of large-deck aircraft carriers. The name "America" was instead assigned to USS America (LHA-6), an amphibious assault ship that was commissioned in 2014.

== History ==
=== Construction ===
Northrop began advanced construction of the carrier under a $2.7 billion contract in 2005. Construction began on 11 August 2005, when Northrop Grumman held a ceremonial steel cut for a 15-ton plate that forms part of a side shell unit of the carrier. On 10 September 2008, the U.S. Navy signed a $5.1 billion contract with Northrop Grumman Shipbuilding in Newport News, Virginia, to design and construct the carrier. The carrier was constructed at the Huntington Ingalls (formerly Northrop Grumman) Newport News Shipbuilding facilities in Newport News.

The keel of the new warship was ceremonially laid on 14 November 2009 in Dry Dock 12 by President Ford's daughter, Susan Ford Bales. In a speech to the assembled shipworkers and Department of Defense officials, Bales said: "Dad met the staggering challenges of restoring trust in the presidency and healing the nation's wounds after Watergate in the only way he knew how, with complete honesty and integrity, and that is the legacy we remember this morning."

In August 2011, the carrier was reported to be "structurally halfway complete". In April 2012, construction was said to be 75% complete. On 24 May 2012, the important milestone of completing the vessel up to the waterline was reached when the critical lower bow was lifted into place. This was the 390th of the nearly 500 lifts of the integral modular components from which the vessel is assembled. Huntington Ingalls reported in an 8 November press release that construction had "reached 87% structural completion". By 19 December 2012, construction had reached 90% structural completion. "Of the nearly 500 total structural lifts needed to complete the ship, 446 have been accomplished."

The island was landed and accompanying ceremony took place on 26 January 2013. On 7 May, the last of 162 superlifts was put in place, bringing the ship to structural completion. On 11 July, a time capsule was welded into a small room just above the floor, continuing a long Navy tradition. The time capsule holds items chosen by Susan Ford Bales, and includes sandstone from the White House, Navy coins, and aviator wings from the ship's first commanding officer.

The ship was originally scheduled for launch in July 2013 and delivery in 2015. Production delays meant that the launch was delayed until 11 October 2013 and the naming ceremony until 9 November 2013, with delivery in February 2016.

On 3 October 2013, Gerald R. Ford had four 30-ton, 21 ft (6.4 m)-diameter bronze propellers installed. The installation of the propellers required more than 10 months of work to install the underwater shafting. On 11 October, the ship's drydock was flooded for the first time to test various seawater-based systems. Her launch date was set to be on the same day as her naming ceremony on 9 November 2013. On 9 November, the ship was christened by Susan Ford Bales, with a bottle of American sparkling wine. The ship's crest was developed jointly by the ship sponsor and first commanding officer, Captain John F. Meier.

As of 2013, construction costs were estimated at $12.8 billion, 22% over the 2008 budget, plus $4.7 billion in research and development costs. Because of budget difficulties, Chief of Naval Operations Admiral Jonathan Greenert warned there might be a two-year delay beyond 2016 in completing Gerald R. Ford. The GAO reported that the price cap would be met by the Navy accepting an incomplete ship for that cost.

On 23 September 2015, the Navy announced that several weeks of testing delays would likely slip the delivery date into April or May 2016. In addition, construction was 93% complete as of September 2015. In July 2016, a memorandum was obtained by CNN from Michael Gilmore, the US Department of Defense's director of Operational Testing and Evaluation indicating that problems with four major flight systems would further delay combat readiness of the ship. She was not expected to be delivered until November 2016, and these issues were suggested to further delay that goal. Construction of the ship was described as 98% complete, with 88% of testing finished. A video documentary of the construction was released by Newport News Shipbuilding in 2017.

By March 2018, due to issues with the nuclear propulsion system and munitions elevators, construction costs had reached $13.027 billion, making Gerald R. Ford the most expensive warship ever built. Planned delivery to the Navy was delayed again, by three months, to October 2019.

=== Performance improvements ===
Gerald R. Ford is the first of a class of aircraft carriers intended to offer significant performance improvements over the previous Nimitz class. Gerald R. Ford is equipped with an AN/SPY-3 and AN/SPY-4 active electronically scanned array multi-function, multi-band radar, with the Ship Self-Defense System (SSDS) Mk2 Baseline 10 of the Mod 6 variant command and control system. Its island, shorter in length and 20 feet (6.1 m) taller than that of the Nimitz class, is set 140 feet (43 m) farther aft and 3 feet (0.91 m) closer to the edge of the ship. Replacing traditional steam catapults, the Electromagnetic Aircraft Launch System (EMALS) will launch all non-VTOL carrier aircraft. This innovation eliminates the traditional requirement to generate and store steam, freeing up considerable area below-deck. With the EMALS, Gerald R. Ford can accomplish 25% more aircraft launches per day than the Nimitz class and requires 25% fewer crew members. The Navy estimates it will save $4 billion in operating costs over a 50-year lifespan. According to an Associated Press story:

"She is truly a technological marvel," Chief of Naval Operations Adm. Jonathan Greenert said in a webcast ceremony at the Newport News, Va., shipyard where Gerald R. Ford is being built, "She will carry unmanned aircraft, joint strike fighters, and she will deploy lasers."

These performance enhancements were problematic in Pentagon tests, and final software fixes for some of the problems were delayed until after the ship's post-shakedown availability in 2019.

=== Operational and major system testing ===
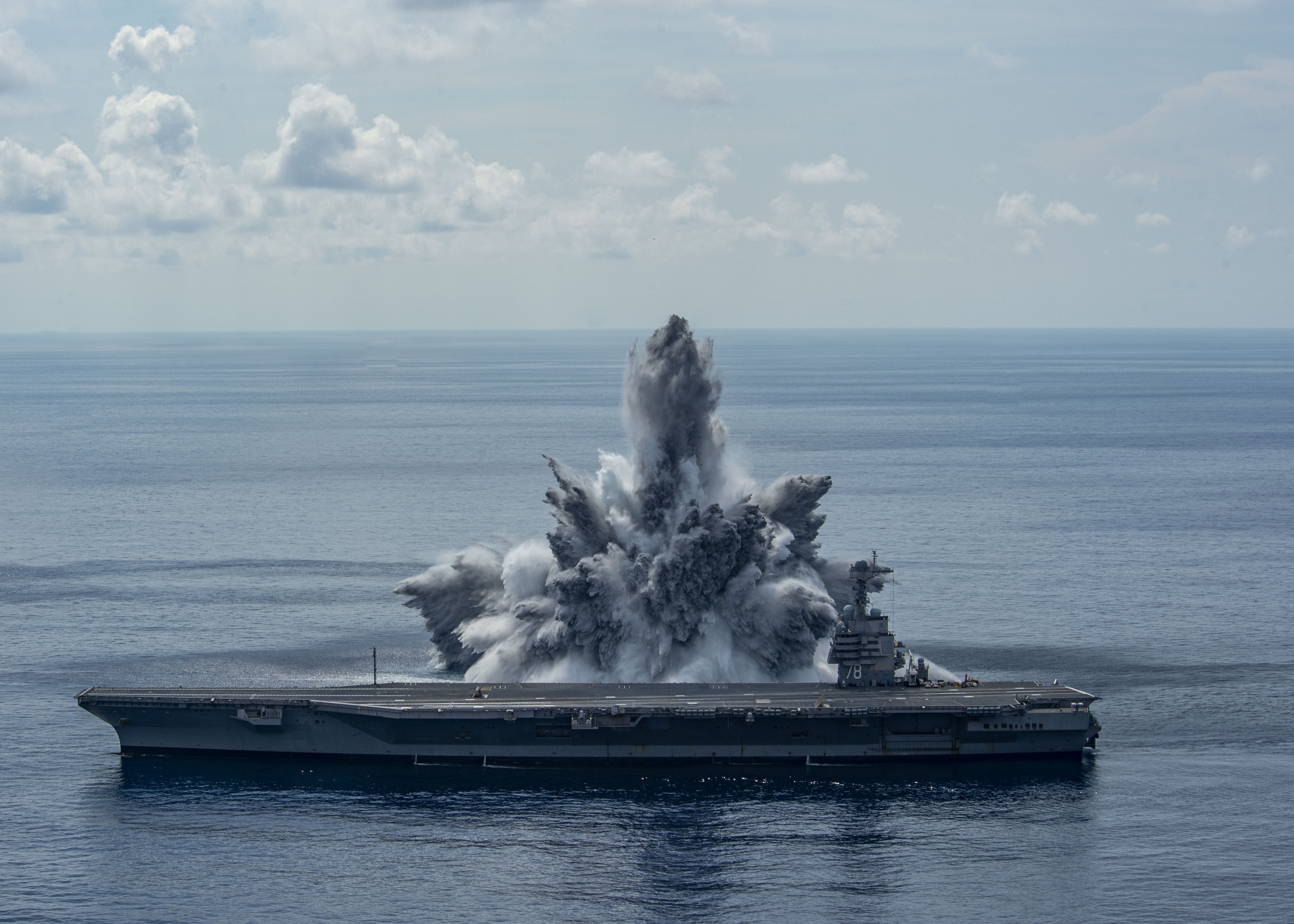
Gerald R. Ford undergoing the third and final blast of the shock trials, 8 August 2021

In January 2014, the annual Director, Operational Test and Evaluation report recorded that critical ship systems in laboratory and test environments (including the EMALS, Advanced Arresting Gear, dual-band radar, and weapons elevators) were not reliable enough and needed more testing and improvements. The Navy implemented a rigorous testing program to ensure performance issues would be resolved before the systems were installed on the aircraft carrier. Major problems with the main turbine generators were found in June 2016. The fix, requiring design changes, was installed and verified during acceptance trials in May 2017. The Initial Operational Test & Evaluation milestone was achieved in April 2017. On 8 April 2017, Gerald R. Ford got underway under her own power for the first time as she headed to sea for builder's trials. She completed the trials and returned to port at Naval Station Norfolk on 14 April 2017. On 24 May 2017, she departed for acceptance trials and completed them on 26 May 2017.

In 2018, the Navy requested to delay shock trials for at least six years to speed up the ship's deployment, but this request was denied. On 18 June 2021, Gerald R. Ford completed her first full-ship shock trial 87 nautical miles (161 km; 100 mi) off Ponce Inlet, Florida, to ensure that she is able to withstand battle conditions. About 40,000 pounds (18 t) of TNT were detonated underwater, measured as a 3.9 magnitude earthquake by USGS. Additional tests were conducted in July and August, with the test detonations set off closer to the hull. The ship was determined to have passed the tests, and this concluded the trials.

=== Delivery ===
On 31 May 2017, Newport News Shipbuilding delivered Gerald R. Ford to the U.S. Navy and her status was changed to Special, in service. Gerald R. Ford was formally commissioned by President Donald Trump into the United States Navy on 22 July 2017. On 28 July, Air Test and Evaluation Squadron 23 (VX-23) performed the first arrested landing and catapult launch from Gerald R. Ford in an F/A-18F Super Hornet.

According to a GAO report in mid-2020, Gerald R. Ford was still reporting significant problems with the operation of her weapons elevators, while a DoD report in early 2021 stated that the ship was still not combat ready, citing continuing problems with the Electromagnetic Aircraft Launch System. Designed to achieve 4,166 aircraft launches between operational mission failures, it instead accomplished only 181.

On 20 March 2021, Gerald R. Ford and the Italian aircraft carrier Cavour conducted Ready for Operations by the Italian Navy while transiting the Atlantic Ocean. In September 2022, Rear Adm. James Downey described the ship as "fully delivered" and has "met her initial operating capability".

When she was commissioned, Gerald R. Ford was the world's largest aircraft carrier and the largest warship ever constructed.

=== Operational service ===
==== 2022 ====
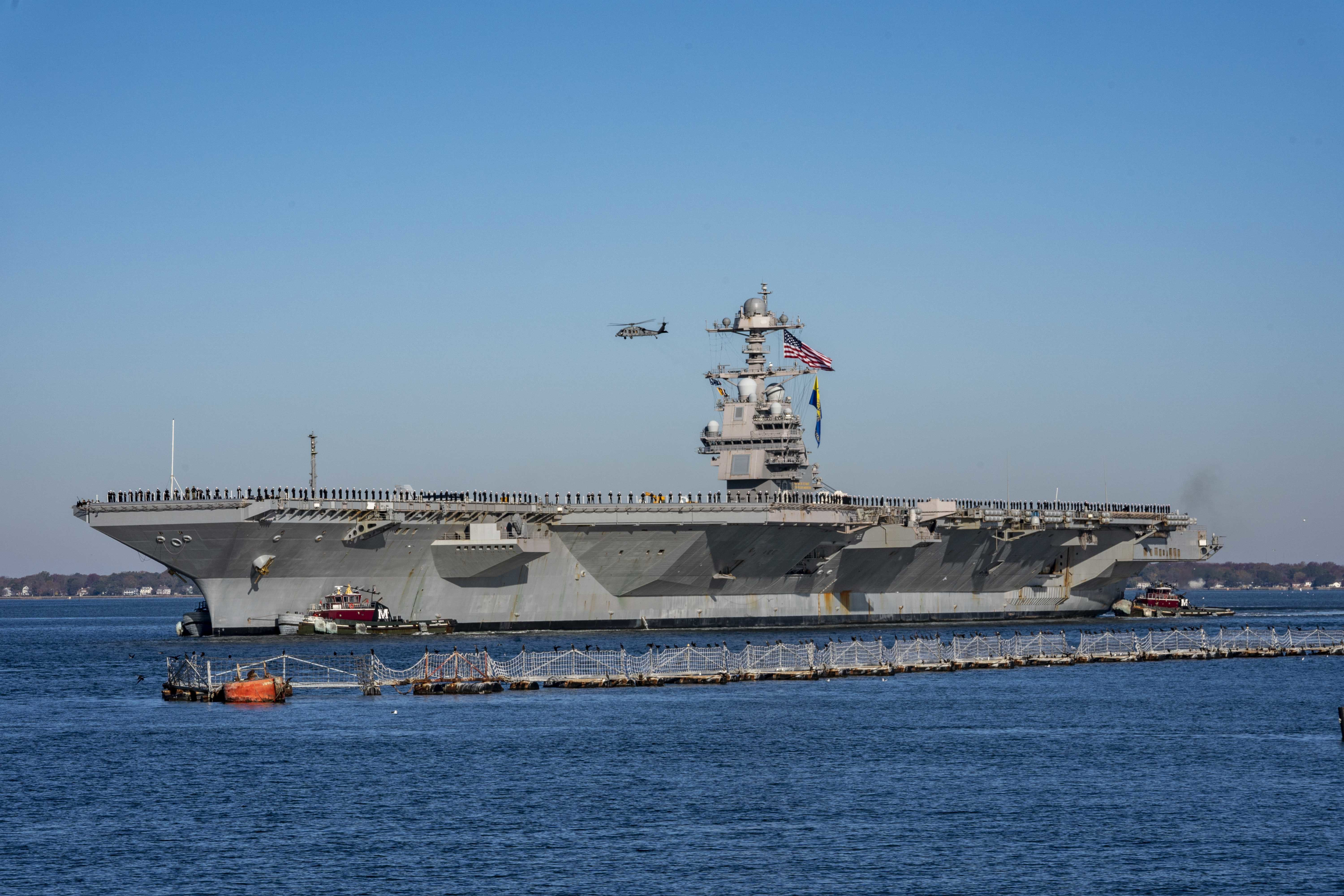
Gerald R. Ford returning to Naval Station Norfolk after completing her inaugural deployment to the Atlantic Ocean, 26 November 2022

Gerald R. Ford left Naval Station Norfolk for Task Force Exercise on 4 October 2022. The carrier was to conduct operations and training exercises alongside NATO allies and partners throughout the Atlantic Ocean. Gerald R. Ford's Carrier Strike Group 12 (CSG 12) included Carrier Air Wing 8, USS Normandy, Destroyer Squadron 2 with USS Ramage, USS McFaul and USS Thomas Hudner, auxiliaries USNS Joshua Humphreys and USNS Robert E. Peary, and the United States Coast Guard cutter USCGC Hamilton. Among the first NATO ships assigned to CSG 12 was the German frigate Hessen.

Gerald R. Ford's first port visit outside of her home country was on 28 October 2022, to Halifax Harbour in Nova Scotia, home of CFB Halifax, Canada's largest military installation and home port of the Royal Canadian Navy's Atlantic fleet. On 14 November 2022 the ship arrived in United Kingdom waters, for a four-day visit anchored in Stokes Bay near Gosport. She returned to Norfolk on 26 November 2022.

==== 2023 ====
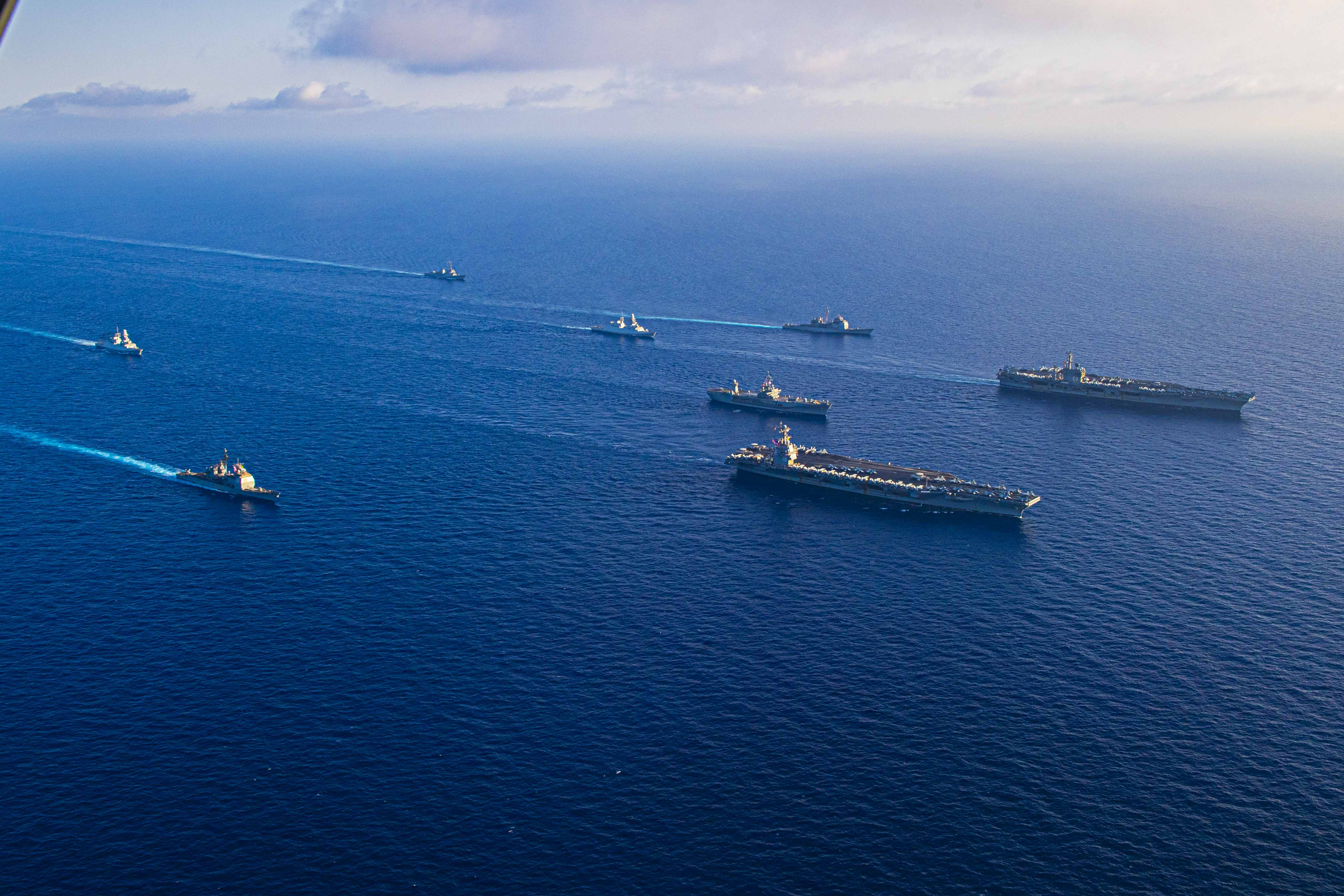
USS Dwight D. Eisenhower and USS Gerald R. Ford carrier strike groups flank USS Mount Whitney, in the Mediterranean Sea, November 2023.

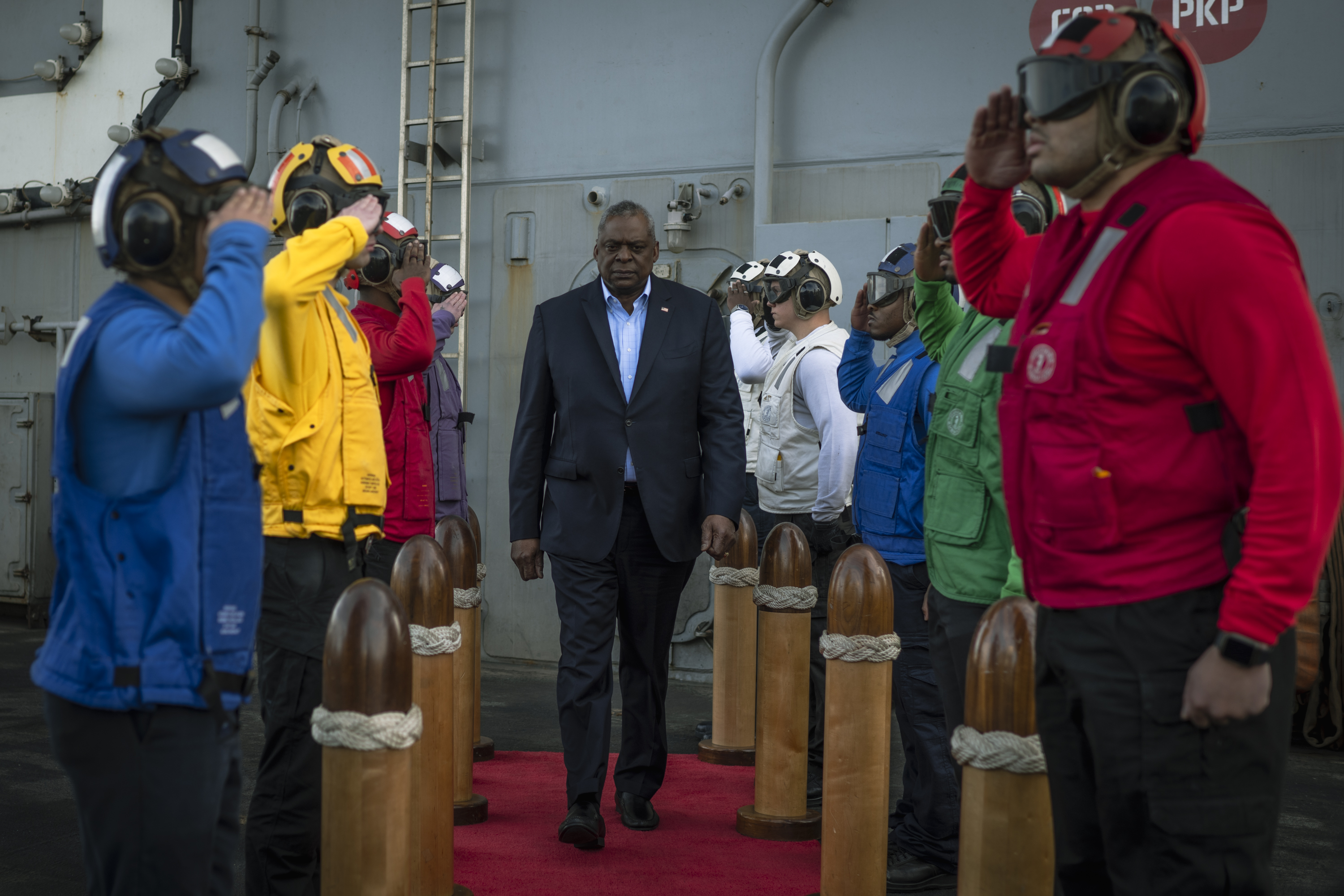
Secretary of Defense Lloyd Austin departs USS Gerald R. Ford, December 2023

She departed Naval Station Norfolk on her first deployment on 2 May 2023. On 3 May 2023, Gerald R. Ford departed Naval Station Norfolk on her first full-length deployment and was scheduled to be operating in the 2nd and 6th Fleet's Area of Responsibility. On 24 May, the ship arrived just outside Oslo, Norway, for NATO exercises, hosting a visit from Norway's Crown Prince Haakon. She was scheduled to head towards the Arctic Ocean later for further drills. On 26 June, the ship sailed to the Mediterranean Sea and arrived at Split, Croatia, for crew rest. In early October, Gerald R. Ford conducted naval exercises with the Italian navy in the Ionian Sea.

On 8 October 2023, the day after the Hamas attack on Israel, the U.S. Secretary of Defense, Lloyd Austin, directed the Gerald R. Ford carrier strike group to the eastern Mediterranean "to bolster regional deterrence efforts." Along with the carrier, the group includes the cruiser Normandy and the destroyers Ramage, Carney, Roosevelt, and Thomas Hudner. The U.S. later also sent USS Dwight D. Eisenhower-led Carrier Strike Group 2 to the Mediterranean to supplement CSG 12 in the same mission. While the carrier remained in the Mediterranean, several of her escort ships were sent into the Red Sea, where they repeatedly intercepted missiles and drones fired from Yemen.

==== 2024 ====
The U.S. 6th Fleet announced on 1 January 2024, that the Gerald R. Ford CSG 12 would return to Norfolk after being relieved by an Amphibious Ready Group consisting of USS Bataan, USS Mesa Verde, and USS Carter Hall. On 17 January, Gerald R. Ford returned to Norfolk after an eight-month deployment. The carrier spent a total of 239 days away from Norfolk, conducted 43 underway replenishments, logged more than 10,396 sorties, and sailed more than 83,476 nmi (154,598 km; 96,062 mi).

==== 2025 ====
On 24 June 2025, Gerald R. Ford began deploying from Norfolk, Virginia, to the Mediterranean. Prior to the end of the Twelve-Day War between Israel and Iran, the Gerald R. Ford Carrier Group was expected to reinforce USS Carl Vinson and USS Nimitz, which would have boosted the US naval deployment in the Middle East to a total of three carrier groups, an unprecedented concentration of US naval power in recent years. The carrier group eventually transited the Strait of Gibraltar and arrived in the Mediterranean on 19 July.

On 17 August 2025, Gerald R. Ford transited the Strait of Dover and moved into the North Sea. On 12 September, she arrived at Oslo, Norway, for a scheduled port visit. Prior to arrival, the carrier and her strike group conducted operations in the North and Norwegian Seas, including joint exercises in the Arctic Circle with the Royal Norwegian Navy's HNoMS Thor Heyerdahl and HNoMS Maud, Germany's Hamburg, and France's Aquitaine and Somme. While in port, the crew participated in city tours and local events, including a veteran's run, and engaged in public outreach in Oslo.

On 24 October, the carrier was redeployed to the Caribbean to take part in the naval deployment in the area, arriving on 12 November, marking the United States' largest military buildup in the Caribbean in 30 years. On 11 December, Gerald R. Ford was reported as involved in the seizure of a foreign oil tanker off the coast of Venezuela.

==== 2026 ====
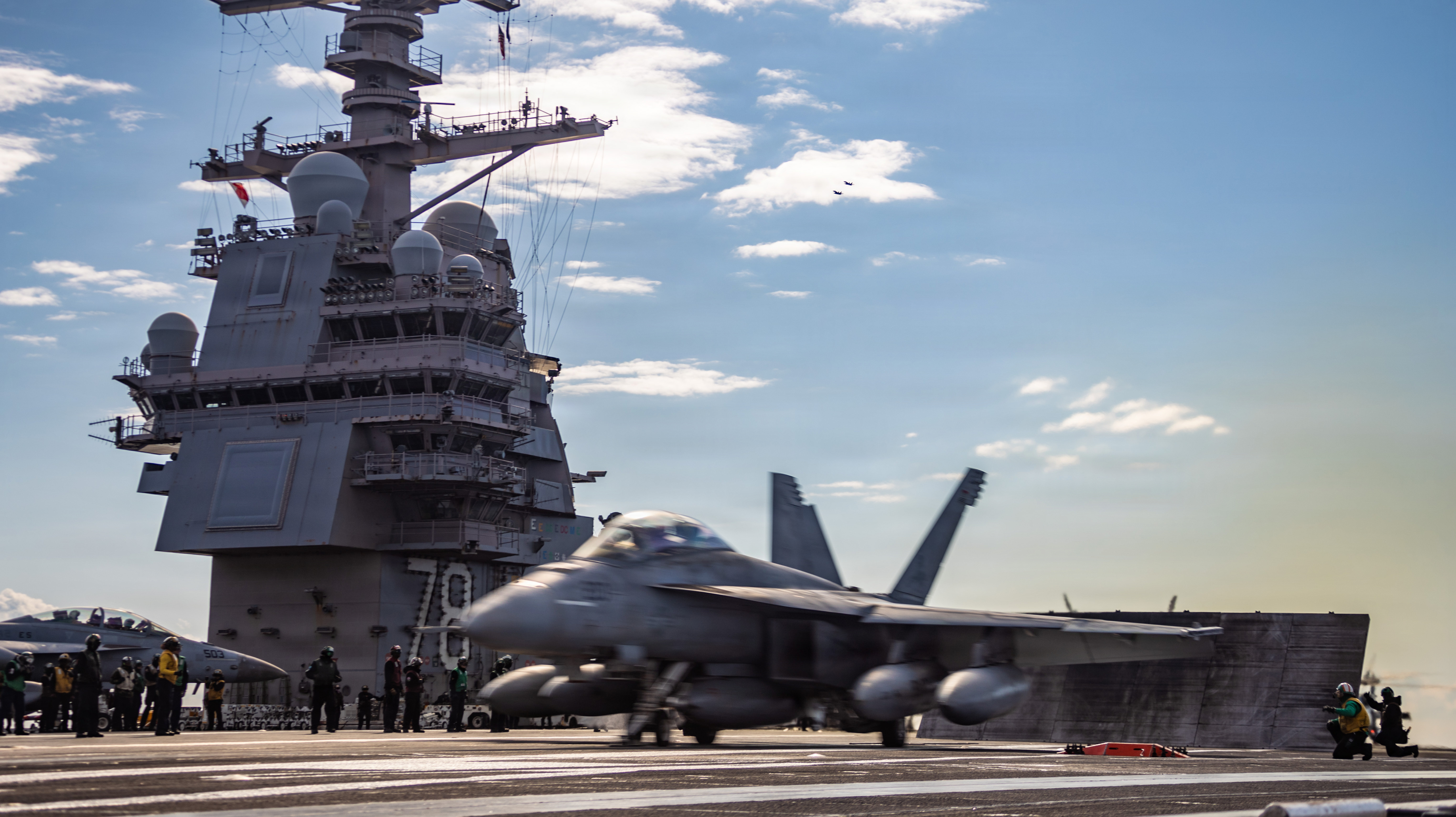
An EA-18G Growler launches from the flight deck during Operation Epic Fury.

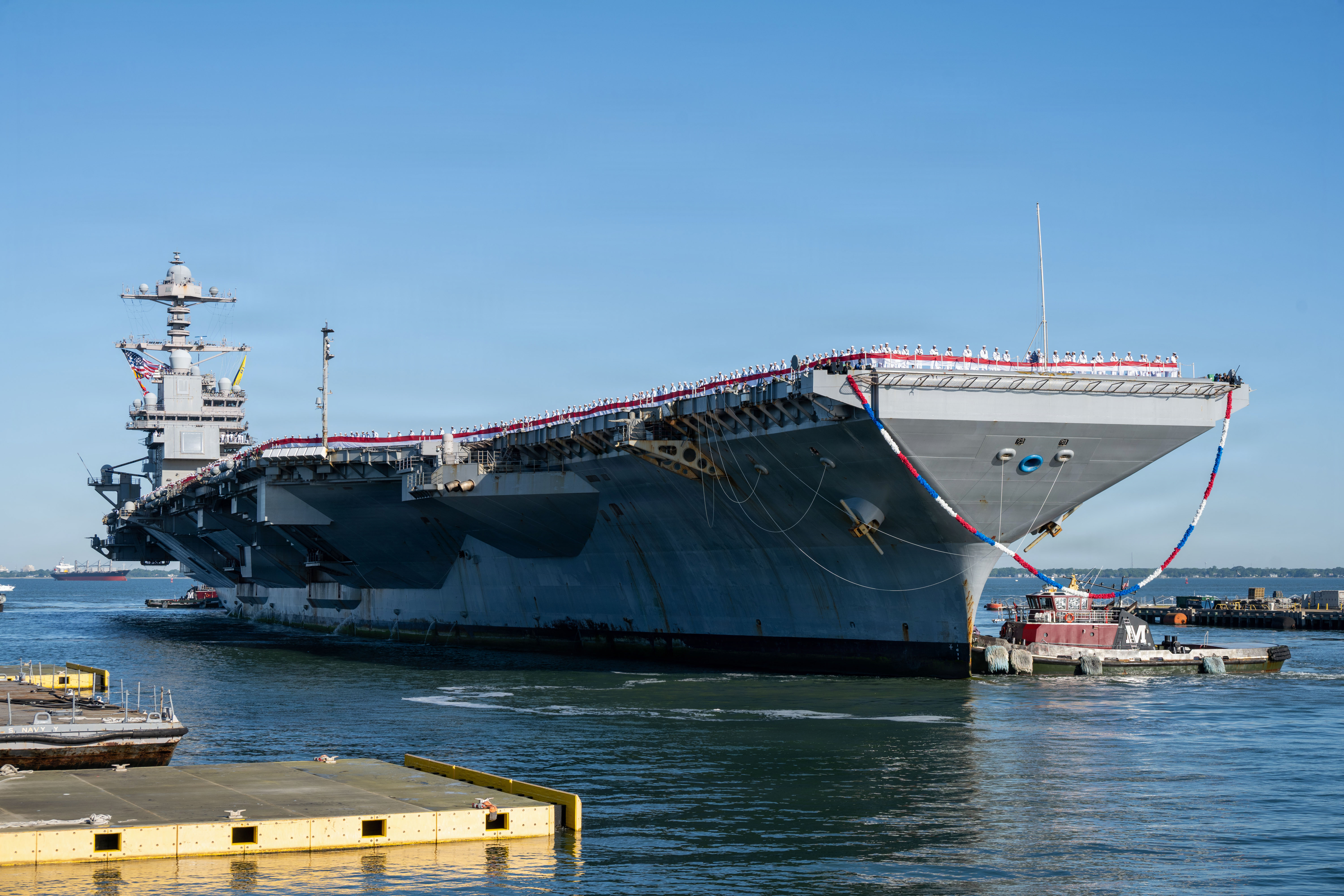
Gerald R. Ford arrives to Naval Station Norfolk following 11-month deployment

By February 2026, the ship had been deployed for about 9 months, one of the longest for carriers. According to information received by The New York Times, the crew was informed on 12 February that the carrier was to join the USS Abraham Lincoln carrier strike group in the Persian Gulf. On 18 February, the crew was told by US officials the carrier initially was likely to be deployed off the coast of Israel. On 20 February, the ship reportedly was seen off the coast of Gibraltar. On 27 February, the carrier was initially deployed off the coast of Israel. On the same day, a large number of United States Air Force refueling planes were deployed in Israel, putting Gerald R. Ford's carrier air wings in range of Iran. Co-ordinated Joint US and Israeli strikes on Iran began the following morning. The next day, US officials announced Gerald R. Ford was launching aircraft as part of Operation Epic Fury.

Media reports emerged starting mid-January revealing issues with the Gerald R. Ford's sewage system, which had been flagged by the US's congressional watchdog as early as 2020 as being poorly designed. Navy officials admitted incidents of clogging had occurred, but denied it had caused a crisis.

While on deployment, a fire on 12 March that began in a dryer vent in the ship's laundry facilities quickly spread to the extent that 30 hours were needed to contain and clean up, and two crew members were injured. By the time the fire was finally extinguished, more than 600 crew members had lost their bunks and personal belongings, forcing them to sleep on tables and floors. A US official later denied that the fire had taken 30 hours to extinguish, clarifying that the time-frame included cleaning up water damage and firefighting substances. The ship maintained war sorties during the efforts.

In June 2026, CNN obtained video footage showing extensive damage caused by the fire, including destroyed berthing compartments and heavily charred bunks. According to a sailor aboard the ship and a senior U.S. official cited by CNN, the carrier's fire-suppression system failed to activate during the incident, requiring crew members to fight the fire manually.

The ship left the operational theater to undergo a first stage of repairs and refueling operations at Crete Naval Base in Souda Bay, Greece.

The Navy announced that some 1,000 mattresses had been sent over the weekend from Naval Station Norfolk, requisitioned from Gerald R. Ford's yet-to-be-commissioned sister ship USS John F. Kennedy. Following a deployment of nine months, Gerald R. Ford is likely to be relieved by USS George H. W. Bush.

The ship later sailed to Split, Croatia, at the local naval shipyards for a second and more extensive stage of repairs. At the end of March, the ship spent five days in Croatia, then resumed its involvement in the Iranian conflict.

16 May 2026, Gerald R. Ford returned to Naval Station Norfolk following her deployment to U.S. 2nd, 4th, 5th, and 6th Fleets with her carrier strike group. This ended a deployment that had lasted 326 days, making the ship the second longest deployed aircraft carrier, behind USS Midway, which had 332 days of deployment. Upon her arrival to Naval Station Norfolk, U.S. Secretary of Defense Pete Hegseth awarded Gerald R. Ford and her carrier strike group the Presidential Unit Citation. From there, she entered an extended maintenance period to fix plumbing issues that had been causing significant problems aboard the ship and to repair damage from the fire.

== Overhauls ==
- July 2018 to October 2019 – Post-shakedown availability
- September 2021 to February 2022 – Planned incremental availability
- January 2024 to April 2024 – Post-deployment maintenance

== See also ==
- List of aircraft carriers
- List of aircraft carriers of the United States Navy
- 2025 United States military strikes on alleged drug traffickers
- 2025 United States naval deployment in the Caribbean
