= HOSTAC =

Helicopter Operations from Ships Other Than Aircraft Carriers (HOSTAC) is a military international standardization program made up of 4 regional HOSTAC Conferences/Working Groups. These regional groups include the NATO HOSTAC, SIANC HOSTAC, Pacific HOSTAC, and Middle East HOSTAC. The primary focus of this international forum is to generate the appropriate standards and maintain up-to-date national information to successfully and safely conduct cross-deck helicopter operations between over 50 navies and coast guards.

The first combined "Global" HOSTAC working group was held in April 2008 in Norfolk, Virginia, USA and included the participation of 34 nations. Since then "Global" HOSTAC working groups have been held at Pearl Harbor, USA (2011); Paris, France (2014) and London, UK (2017). The 2020 "Global" HOSTAC was cancelled due to Covid-19.

The HOSTAC publications (MPP-02 Volume I, MPP-02.1, MPP-02.2, MPP-02.3, and MPP-02.1.1) are part of the Multinational Publications Electronic Library MPEL. National data is kept updated and current through updated versions.

In 2013, The NATO Multinational Through-deck and Aircraft Carrier Cross-deck Operations (MTACCOPS) Working Group joined the HOSTAC program to cover rotary wing and fixed wing cross operations involving large deck aviation ships.
