= Mike Bernacchi =

U.S. Navy rear admiral

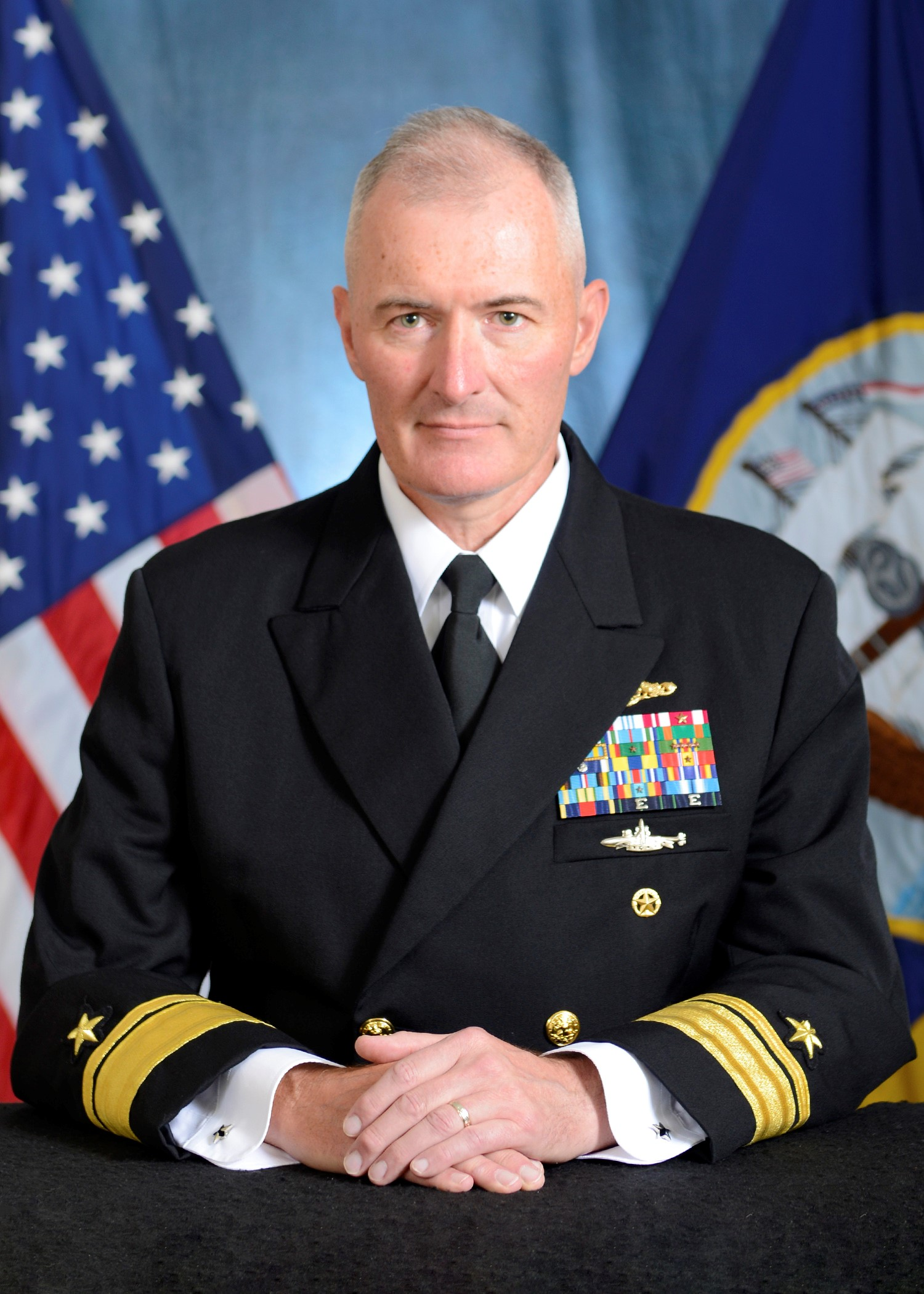
- Official portrait, 2019
- Born: 1965 (age 60–61); Pleasant Ridge, Michigan, U.S.
- Military career
- Allegiance: United States
- Branch: United States Navy
- Service years: 1988–2023
- Rank: Rear Admiral
- Commands: Naval Service Training Command; Submarine Group 10; Submarine Squadron 4 USS Alexandria (SSN 757)
- Awards: Legion of Merit (8)

Michael Dennis Bernacchi Jr. (born 1965) is a retired United States Navy rear admiral who last served as the deputy commander of the United States Tenth Fleet.

== Early life and education ==
Bernacchi was raised in Pleasant Ridge, Michigan, where his father was a professor of marketing at the nearby University of Detroit. The younger Bernacchi attended Shrine High School and graduated from the University of Detroit in 1988 with a B.S. degree in biology. He later earned master's degrees in nuclear engineering and industrial engineering from the University of Michigan.

== Military career ==
From August 9, 2017, to April 25, 2020, Bernacchi commanded the Naval Service Training Command.

In June 2020, Bernacchi was reassigned to the United States Space Command as the director of strategy, plans, and policy. He started in his new assignment on July 10, 2020. In March 2022, he was reassigned as deputy commander of the United States Tenth Fleet.

== Dates of promotion ==
| Rank | Date |
|---|---|
| Rear Admiral (lower half) | 2017 |
| Rear Admiral | June 1, 2020 |

Military offices
| Preceded by Stephen C. Evans | Commander of the Naval Service Training Command; 2017–2019 | Succeeded by Milton J. Sands III |
| Preceded by Jeffrey T. Jablon | Commander of Submarine Group 10; 2019–2020 | Succeeded by John D. Spencer |
| Preceded by Marcus A. Hitchcock | Director of Strategy, Plans, and Policy of the United States Space Command; 2020–2022 | Succeeded by Michael T. Morrissey |
| Preceded by Will Pennington | Deputy Commander of the United States Tenth Fleet; 2022–2023 | Succeeded by Kurtis A. Mole |
