= Multinational Publications Electronic Library =

The Multinational Publications Electronic Library (MPEL) is a series of unclassified, maritime operational and procedural publications that provide nations with common doctrine, techniques, training, procedures and information for planning and conducting operations and exercises with and between nontraditional partners.

The MPEL CD-ROM is distributed by the Navy Warfare Development Command to non-NATO coalition partners. These publications are available through a North Atlantic Treaty Organization (NATO) sponsor to all nations. The NATO Standardization Office (NSO) is the office within NATO that administers the Multinational Publication (MP) program.
