= Navy Warfare Development Command =

U.S. Navy command for the generation of innovation in concepts and doctrine

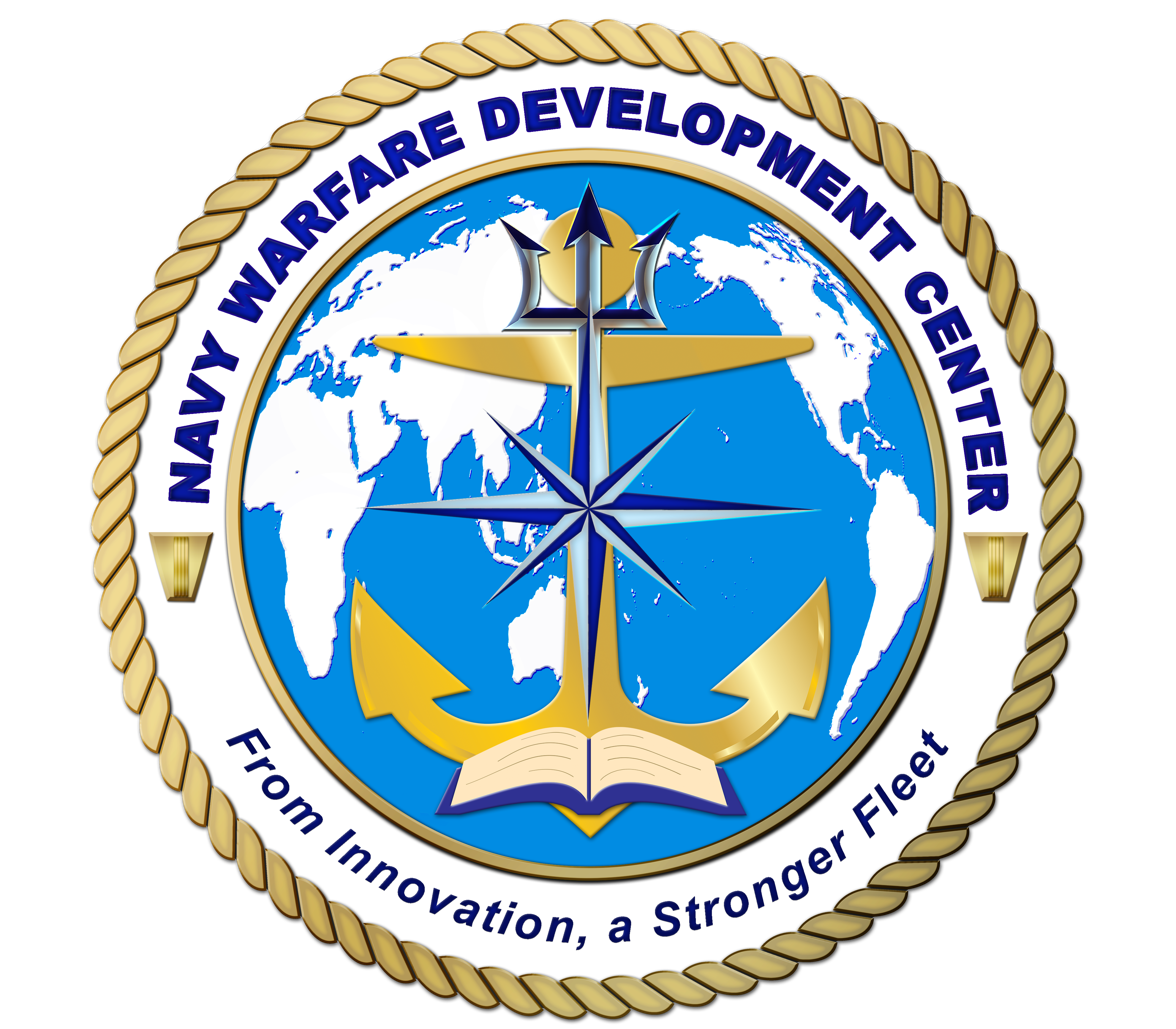
- Country: United States
- Branch: United States Navy
- Type: Development Command
- Role: Developing and implementing naval warfare strategies and tactics
- Garrison/HQ: Naval Station Norfolk, Virginia
- Website: nwdc.navy.mil

The Navy Warfare Development Command is a command of the United States Navy for the generation and development of innovations in concepts and doctrine for enhanced operational level maritime capability and integration in joint and coalition activities. It is currently located at Naval Station Norfolk, VA.

The Navy Warfare Development Command team has a role in planning the future of the US Navy, not only in the tactical realm, but also at the operational and strategic levels. It is responsible for the Navy component of the "Blue Cell" Naval Services Game wargaming exercise.

== History ==
In 1998, the Chief of Naval Operations established the Navy Warfare Development Command to coordinates the development of concepts of operations, doctrine, experimentation, and lessons learned in direct support of the fleet. The command also provides modeling and simulation for training, experimentation, and focused analysis.

== Concept Generation and Concept Development ==
The Chief of Naval Operations initiated the Concept Generation and Concept Development program to encourage a culture of innovation throughout the Navy and to gather ideas on ways to address current and future warfighting gaps to inform investment decisions and develop full capability across doctrine, organization, training, materiel, leadership, education, personnel, and facilities spectrum.
