= AN/SPN-35 =

Naval warship Precision Approach Radar landing system

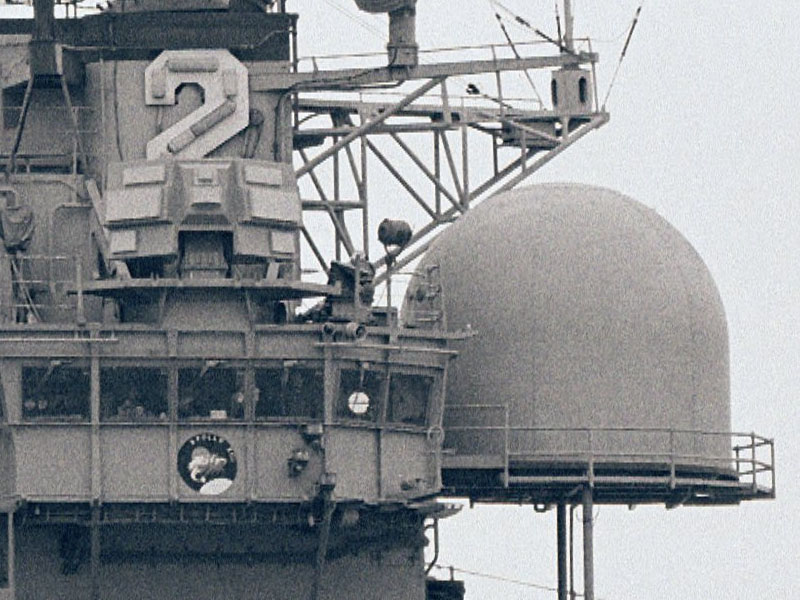
- AN/SPN-35 Approach Radar on USS Iwo Jima (LPH-2), 1987
- Country of origin: United States
- Manufacturer: ITT-Gilfillan
- Type: Precision approach radar
- Frequency: 9.0 to 9.2 GHz band
- PRF: 1200 pps
- Pulsewidth: 0.2 microseconds (Note: Friedman cites pulsewidth as 0.8s)
- Power: 200 kW (Note: Power is 175 kW per Friedman)
- Related: AN/TPN-8

The AN/SPN-35 is a Precision Approach Radar (PAR) landing system installed on the Tarawa-class amphibious assault ships and America-class amphibious assault ships allowing Air Traffic Controllers to provide guidance and glide slope corrections to aircraft during the final approach and landing.

The Joint precision approach and landing system (JPALS) is slated to replace the AN/SPN-35 on U.S. Navy amphibious assault ships.

In accordance with the Joint Electronics Type Designation System (JETDS), the "AN/SPN-35" designation represents the 35th design of an Army-Navy electronic device for waterborne navigational aid radar system. The JETDS system also now is used to name all Department of Defense electronic systems.

== Description ==
The AN/SPN-35 is used to offer guidance to the aircraft pilot on final approach. It provides relative azimuth, range, and elevation information to the radar operator, who relays this as verbal guidance to the aircraft pilot on approach.

The AN/SPN-35A variant has two antennas: the azimuth antenna (AS-1292/TPN-8) and the elevation antenna (AS-1669/SPN-35). The azimuth antenna is located above the azimuth drive assembly on the stabilized yoke. The elevation antenna is mounted on the elevation drive assembly adjacent to the azimuth antenna.

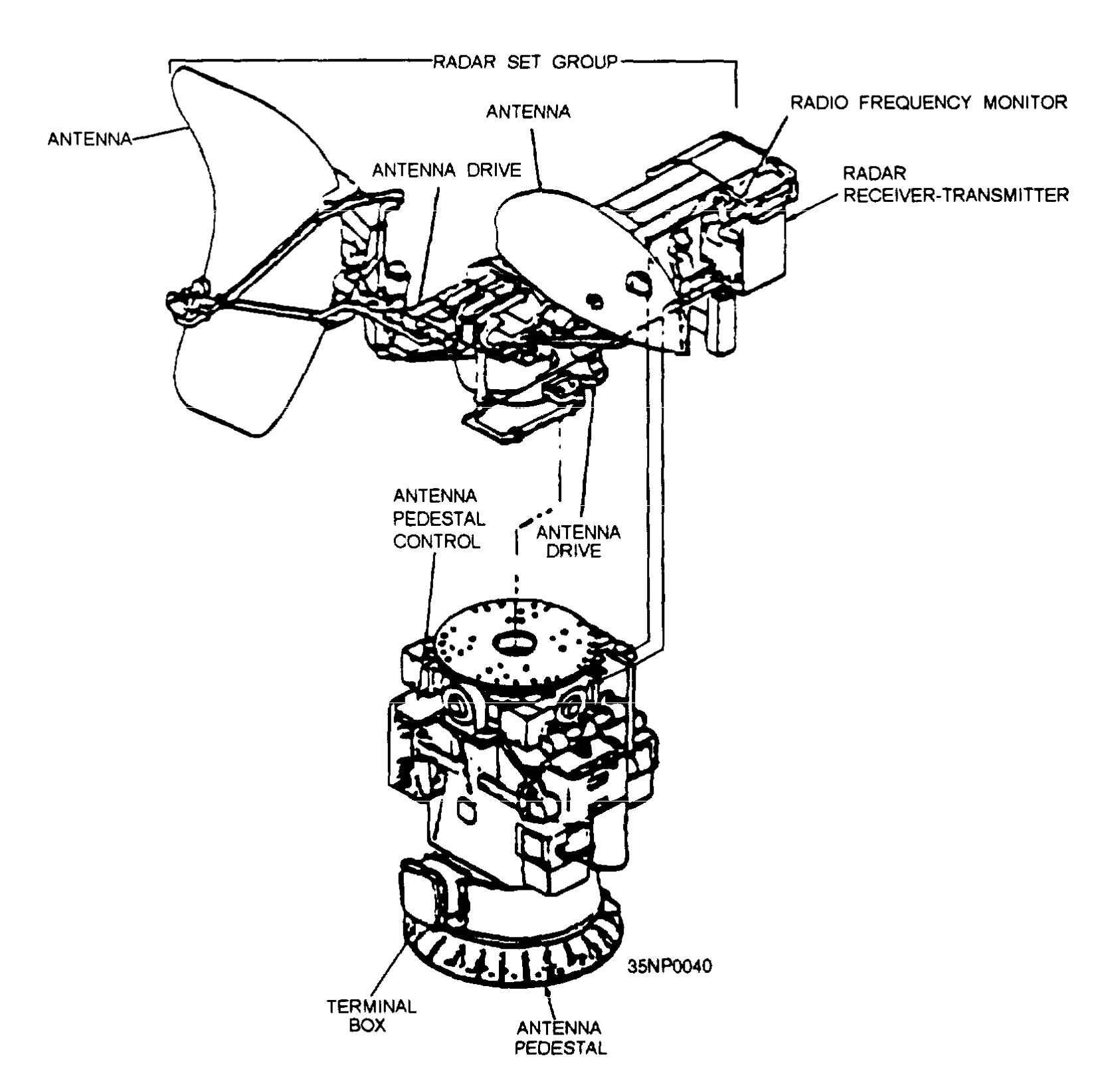
Diagram of AN/SPN-35A

== History ==
The AN/SPN-35 was developed from the ground-based AN/TPN-8 landing approach control radar. It was first evaluated on the USS Kearsarge in 1962, as an AN/TPN-8 mounted to an AN/SPN-6 stable pedestal and secured to an AN/SPN-8 platform. A prototype was evaluated aboard the USS Bon Homme Richard (CV-31) about a year later as a replacement for the AN/SPN-8 on ASW carriers and small attack carriers. As of 1965, the AN/SPN-35 was being used "primarily on the ASW type carriers."

The -35A variant was used onboard Nimitz-class aircraft carriers prior to 1996, when it was replaced by the AN/SPN-46A/B. It remains in use on the Wasp class and America class today.

== Platforms ==
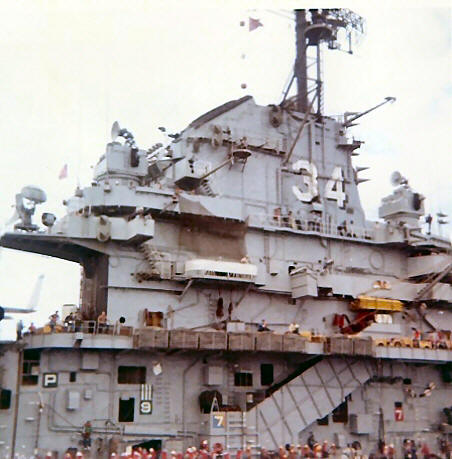
Photo of USS Oriskany (CV-34) with AN/SPN-35 (left) without radome

=== (Australia) Royal Australian Navy ===
- HMAS Melbourne (R21)

=== (Spain) Spanish Navy ===
- Príncipe de Asturias

=== (United Kingdom) Royal Navy ===
- HMS Ark Royal (R09)

=== United States Navy ===
- Ship classes known to carry this system:
  - Tarawa-class amphibious assault ship
  - Wasp-class amphibious assault ship
  - America-class amphibious assault ship
  - Nimitz-class aircraft carrier - Replaced by AN/SPN-46 in the late 90s.
- Individual ships known to carry this system:
  - USS Intrepid (CV-11)
  - USS Hornet (CV-12)
  - USS Ticonderoga (CV-14) - Installed 1965 while undergoing overhaul at San Francisco Bay Naval Shipyard.
  - USS Bon Homme Richard (CV-31) - Initial testing and evaluation
  - USS Kearsarge (CV-33) - Initial testing and evaluation
  - USS Oriskany (CV-34)
  - USS Ranger (CV-61)
  - USS Tripoli (LPH-10)
  - USS Inchon (MCS-12)

== Variants ==
- AN/SPN-35: Original model that entered service.
- AN/SPN-35A: Improved stabilization system to compensate for pitch and roll of carrier. Replaces the original mechanical-hydraulic stabilization of the original with an electromechanical stabilization system.
- AN/SPN-35B:
- AN/SPN-35C: Upgrade to AN/SPN-35B. Adds Moving Target Detection (MTD), Track While Scan (TWS), and Built-In Test (BIT) capability.

== See also ==
- AN/SPN-46
- List of radars
- List of military electronics of the United States

== Bibliography ==
- Moore, John Evelyn (1984). Jane's Fighting Ships 1984-85. Jane's Information Group. ISBN 9780710607959.
- Saunders, Stephen; Philpott, Tom (2015). Jane's fighting ships 2015-2016. p. 960. ISBN 978-0-7106-3143-5. OCLC 919022075.
- Stille, Mark (2022). Essex-Class Aircraft Carriers 1945–91. Bloomsbury Publishing. pp. 16–17, 32. ISBN 9781472845795.
- Simmons, Larry D.; Ace, Floyd L. (October 1995). Electronics Technician: Volume 7 - Antennas and Wave Propagation (PDF). Vol. 7. Naval Education and Training Professional Development and Technology Center. pp. 2-29 – 2-30.
- Friedman, Norman (1981). Naval Radar. London: Conway Maritime Press. ISBN 0851772382.
- Edward, Brad (2010). Nimitz-class aircraft carriers. Osprey publishing. p. 29. ISBN 978-1-84603-759-7.
- Hobbs, David (2013). British Aircraft Carriers: Design, Development and Service Histories. Barnsley, UK: Seaforth Publishing. p. 295. ISBN 978-1-84832-138-0.
