= VSTOL Support Ship =

Proposed US aircraft carrier design

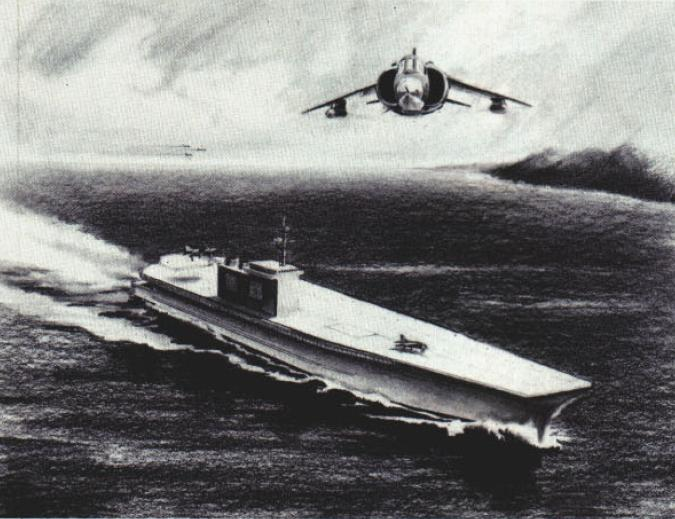
Artist's conception of the VSTOL Support Ship design

The VSTOL Support Ship (VSS) was a proposed light aircraft carrier design for the United States Navy in the late 1970s that would be smaller and less expensive than the Navy's existing aircraft carriers such as the Nimitz-class. The design would cost one-quarter as much, although the V/STOL aircraft it would carry would have reduced performance. The United States Senate and others supported the design, but it was ultimately rejected by the Navy.

== Development and design ==
In the early 1970s, the Chief of Naval Operations (CNO), Elmo Zumwalt, proposed that the US Navy build the Sea Control Ship (SCS), a small aircraft carrier equipped with helicopters and V/STOL aircraft such as the AV-8A Harrier which was intended for convoy escort operations. The austere SCS design was heavily opposed by factions within the US Navy, including Admiral Hyman G. Rickover and much of the Naval aviation community and plans to purchase the SCS were rejected by the US Congress in 1975.

Zumwalt's successor as CNO, James L. Holloway III abandoned plans for the SCS and instead proposed a larger and faster design, the VSTOL Support Ship, or VSS. By June 1976, it was planned that the VSS would be 690 feet (210 m) long and would be powered by four General Electric LM2500 gas turbines driving two propeller shafts (essentially double the machinery of the single shaft SCS) which would give a speed of 29 knots (54 km/h; 33 mph). It would carry 22 helicopters (16 H-53 Sea Stallions and six LAMPS light helicopters) together with four Harriers. Holloway hoped to develop a series of advanced V/STOL aircraft, including a supersonic fighter and a utility aircraft for Anti-Submarine and Airborne Early Warning duties which could operate from the VSS as well as from the Navy's existing carriers, although these types were never fully defined. The need to accommodate the new designs resulted in the carrier's design being reworked in February 1978 as the VSS II. This design had a larger hangar and greater beam than the original design to allow the potentially larger advanced aircraft to be carried, and carried substantially more aviation fuel.

A third variant, the VSS III, evolved by July 1978 as a result of a requirement to protect the ship's magazines. In order to cope with the extra weight of the armor, the ship had a new hull form with less freeboard but allowing greater speed. The final VSS III design was 717 feet (218.5 m) long overall and 690 feet (210.3 m) at the waterline, with a beam of 178 feet (54.3 m) and a draft of 24 feet 4 inches (7.42 m). Displacement was 20,116 long tons (20,439 t) light and 29,130 long tons (29,600 t) full load. As well as the ship's aircraft, two quadruple Harpoon anti-ship-missile launchers were to be mounted on the fantail, with two Phalanx Close-in weapon systems were to be fitted. A complement of 49 officers and 910 other ranks were to operate the ship while the ship's air wing had 87 officers and 541 other ranks.

== See also ==
- Sea Control Ship
- Aircraft Carrier (Medium)
