= Aircraft Carrier (Medium) =

Design for an aircraft carrier in the US

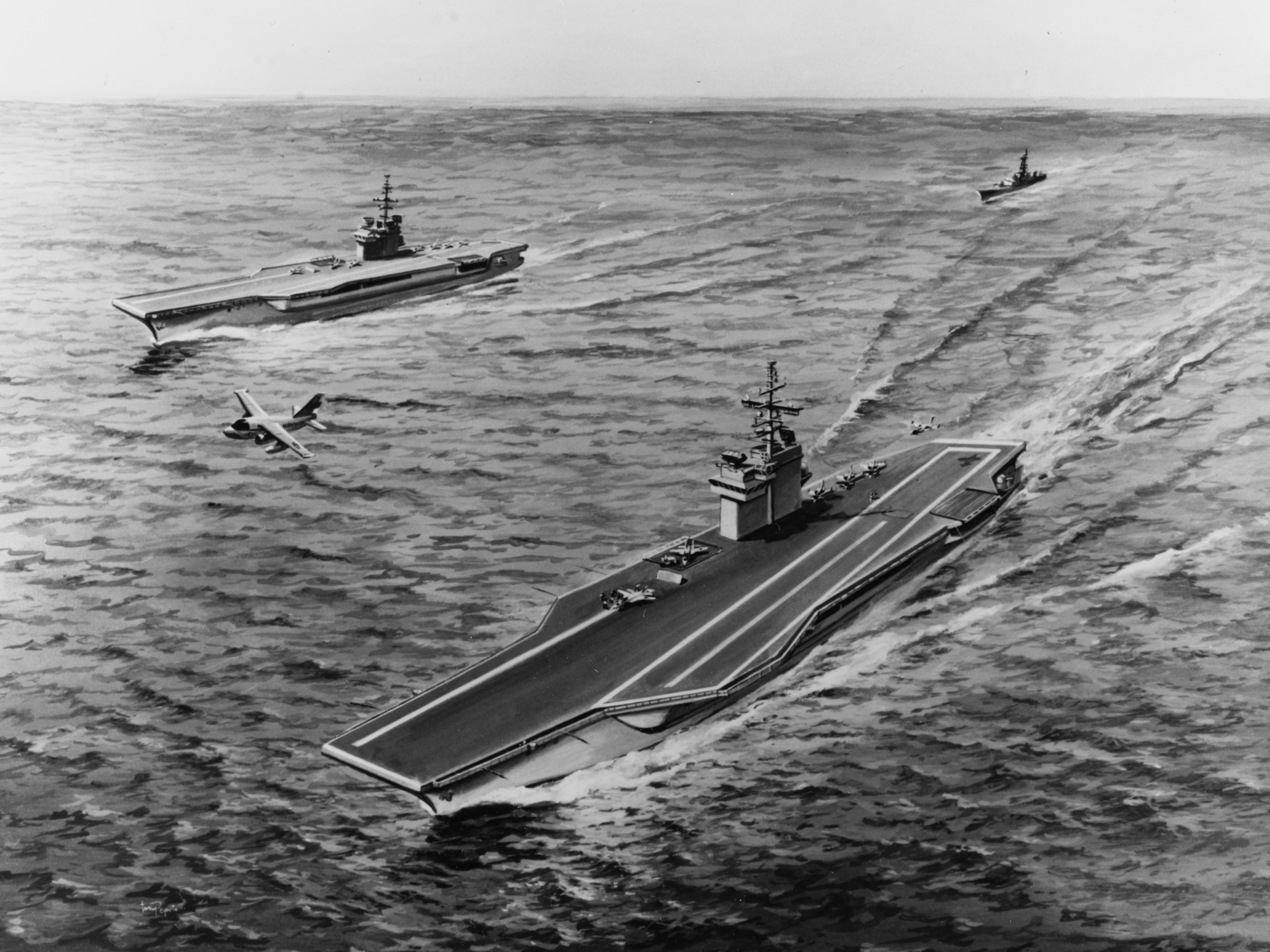
- Artist's impression of CVV design (1978)

Class overview
- Name: Aircraft Carrier (Medium) (CVV)
- Builders: Never built
- Operators: United States Navy
- Cost: $1.5 billion USD 1979 dollars (est.) US$8.2 billion 2017 dollars (est.)
- Planned: 1

General characteristics
- Type: Aircraft carrier
- Displacement: 52,200 tons (standard); 62,427 tons (full load)
- Length: 912 ft (278 m) (waterline); 923 ft (281 m) (overall)
- Beam: 126 ft (38 m) (waterline); 256.5 ft (78.2 m) (flight deck)
- Draft: 34 ft (10 m)
- Propulsion: Steam turbines, two shafts, 100,000 shp (75,000 kW)
- Speed: 27–29 kn (50–54 km/h)
- Range: 8,000 mi (13,000 km)
- Complement: 3,400–3,900 (including air wing)
- Sensors & processing systems: AN/SPS-49 2-D air-search radar; AN/SPS-48C 3-D radar
- Armament: 2 × 20-mm Phalanx CIWS mounts
- Aircraft carried: 55–65

The Aircraft Carrier (Medium) (CVV) (Note: Alternatively, Vari-Purpose Carrier) was an American design for a conventional-powered (i.e. non-nuclear-powered) aircraft carrier proposed in the 1970s. It was to be smaller and cheaper than the contemporary nuclear-powered Nimitz class. A single example was planned, but was not built, with further Nimitz-class carriers built instead.

== Development and design ==
In the early 1970s, the United States Navy, following the doctrine of Chief of Naval Operations Admiral Elmo Zumwalt for larger numbers of smaller and cheaper ships, initiated design studies for a "minimum-cost" carrier of 50,000–60,000 tons. The new design was planned to be much cheaper than nuclear-powered carriers (a cost target of $550 million was set in 1972) but still be suitable for replacing the aging Midway-class aircraft carriers. (Note: At the same time, Zumwalt proposed the 14,000 ton Sea Control Ship, equipped with V/STOL aircraft and helicopters to replace the Essex-class ASW carriers.) But work on the project (designated T-CBL) was stopped when the US Congress made statements encouraging all major warships to be nuclear-powered, and in 1976 an order was placed for a fourth nuclear-powered Nimitz-class aircraft carrier.

Later that year, however, US President Gerald Ford cancelled the order for the fourth Nimitz, stating that instead, two CVVs (medium-sized, conventional-powered carriers which were expected to mainly operate V/STOL aircraft) would be built. The existing T-CBL design formed the basis for the new CVV, this being of the required size, while also capable of operating all existing conventional carrier aircraft (this proved important, as the hoped-for supersonic V/STOL fighters did not come to fruition).

The CVV carried a smaller air group than existing supercarriers (i.e. about 60 compared with about 90 for the nuclear-powered Nimitz class or the conventional-powered Kitty Hawk-class aircraft carriers) and had two steam catapults rather than four, and three arrestor cables instead of four. The CVV also had a less powerful power plant, with steam turbines fed by six boilers generating 100,000 shaft horsepower (75,000 kW) in a two-shaft arrangement, compared with the 280,000 shaft horsepower (210,000 kW) delivered to four shafts of the larger carriers, giving a speed of 28 knots (52 km/h) compared with over 31 knots (57 km/h). While slower than earlier carriers, this was still sufficiently fast to keep up with carrier task forces. Not all of the design features in the CVV were less capable than earlier carriers, however, as the carrier was planned to have improved protection for the ship's magazines and to be protected against under-keel explosions.

The Carter administration from 1977 onwards continued with the CVV program, by now expected to cost $1.5 billion per ship compared to $2.4 billion for a Nimitz, vetoing congressional attempts to vote $2 billion towards construction of a fourth Nimitz, although plans for a second CVV were abandoned. When it was realized that a repeat of USS John F. Kennedy, the last conventionally powered large carrier to be built would only cost about $100 million more than the CVV, while being much more capable, the Navy and the Secretary of Defense Harold Brown recommended that a repeat John F. Kennedy be included in the 1980 shipbuilding program instead of the CVV, but this was rejected by Carter, partly based on the lower life-cycle costs of the smaller ship with its smaller airwing.

A fourth Nimitz-class vessel, USS Theodore Roosevelt was authorized in the FY 81 budget, however, and the election of Ronald Reagan meant that defense budgets were no longer strained, meaning an end to the CVV.

== See also ==
- Sea Control Ship
- VSTOL Support Ship
