= Sea Control Ship =

Concept aircraft carrier

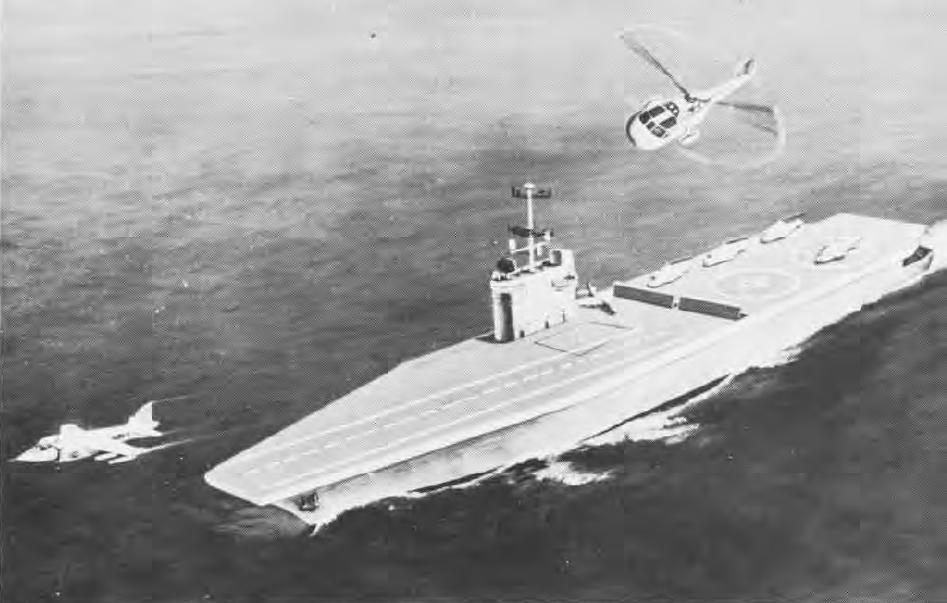
- Artist conception (1972)

Class overview
- Name: Sea Control Ship (SCS)
- Builders: Never built
- Operators: United States Navy
- Cost: $100 Million USD 1973 dollars (est.) $626 Million USD 2022 dollars (est.)
- Planned: 8

General characteristics
- Type: ASW carrier
- Displacement: 9,773 tons (light); 13,736 tons (full load)
- Length: 620 ft (190 m)
- Beam: 80 ft (24 m)
- Draft: 21.62 ft (6.59 m)
- Propulsion: 2 × General Electric LM2500+ gas turbines, one shaft, 45,000 shp; 3 × 2500 kW ship service generators (SSG)
- Speed: 26 knots (48 km/h); 24 knots (44 km/h) (sustained)
- Complement: 76 officers; 624 enlisted
- Armament: 2 x 20-mm Phalanx CIWS mounts
- Aircraft carried: 3 × AV-8A Harrier VTOL; 3 × SH-2 Seasprite LAMPS I; 14 × SH-3 Sea King
- Aviation facilities: Flight deck: 545 ft × 105 ft (166 m × 32 m); Enclosed hangar: 19 ft (5.8 m) high; Aircraft elevators: 60,000 lb. (27.2 mt) lift capacity; Centerline: 60 ft × 30 ft (18.3 m × 9.1 m); Stern: 35 ft × 50 ft (11 m × 15 m); JP-5 fuel capacity: 950 tons (861.8 mt); Aviation ordance: 180 tons (163 mt)

The Sea Control Ship (SCS) was a small aircraft carrier developed and conceptualized by the United States Navy under Chief of Naval Operations Elmo Zumwalt during the 1970s. Currently the term refers to naval vessels that can perform similar duties. The SCS was intended as an escort vessel, providing air support for convoys. It was canceled after budgetary cuts to the US Navy.

The SCS was to be equipped with a mix of Rockwell XFV-12 fighter aircraft and anti-submarine warfare helicopters. It was tasked with carrying out anti-submarine warfare operations.

== Concept ==
In the late 1960s, studies by US Navy identified a potential requirement for large scale convoy operations in the event of a war with the Soviet Union. In order to compensate for a shortage of escort ships, it was suggested that helicopters operating from small helicopter carriers could fill the gap. When Elmo Zumwalt became Chief of Naval Operations in 1970, he seized on the idea of small helicopter carriers as part of his "High-Low" plan in which large numbers of cheaper lower capability ships would be built to supplement existing expensive high capability ships. The proposed small carrier, which was named the Sea Control Ship (SCS), was required to provide continuous airborne cover of two anti-submarine and one airborne early warning helicopters, as well as carrying VSTOL fighters to stop Soviet long-range aircraft (like the Tupolev Tu-95 "Bear") from shadowing convoys and directing submarines and surface ships against them. This resulted in a requirement to carry 14 helicopters and three VSTOL fighters such as the AV-8 Harrier. It was hoped that production SCSs could be built for $100 million each, an eighth of the price of a full sized aircraft carrier.

The resultant design had a full load displacement of 13,736 long tons (13,956 t) and an overall length of 610 feet (190 m). It was to be powered by two General Electric LM2500 gas turbines generating 45,000 shaft horsepower (34,000 kW) and driving a single shaft, which would propel the ship to a speed of 26 knots (48 km/h; 30 mph). Weaponry was to be limited, consisting of two Phalanx Close-in weapon systems to defend against anti-ship missiles.

== Experimental Sea Control Ship ==
In 1971 USS Guam was chosen as a test vessel. Testing began on 18 January 1972. In 1974 she was deployed to the Atlantic Ocean. The vessel was equipped with AV-8A Harrier STOVL fighters and SH-3 Sea King ASW helicopters. The tests were completed in July 1974; USS Guam resumed its role as an amphibious assault ship.

== Related ships ==
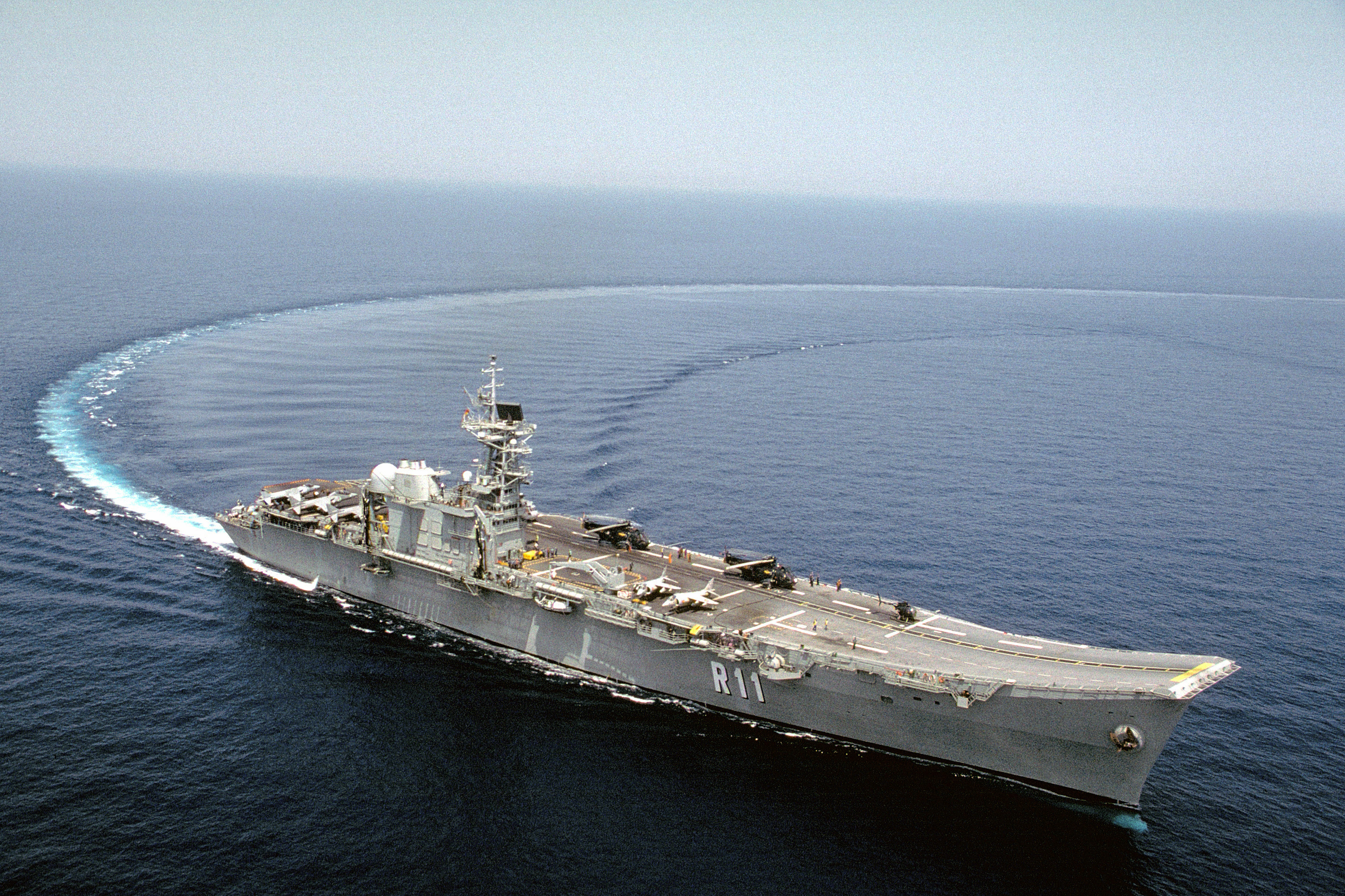
The Spanish aircraft carrier Principe de Asturias was based on the original Sea Control Ship design

The SCSs were smaller than most fleet aircraft carriers, and the concept was adopted by two countries wanting inexpensive aircraft carriers. Spain's Príncipe de Asturias, and her smaller cousin ship, Thailand's HTMS Chakri Naruebet, were based on the final US Navy blueprints for a dedicated sea control ship, but with the addition of a ski-jump ramp and follow a similar mission profile.

== See also ==
- VSTOL Support Ship
- Aircraft Carrier (Medium)
- SS Atlantic Causeway
- USS Nassau (LHA-4)
- USS Bataan (LHD-5)
- USS Bonhomme Richard (LHD-6)
- Invincible-class aircraft carrier
- Helicopter carrier
- Anti-submarine warfare carrier
- Arapaho Containerized Aircraft Handling System, a similar 1970s-80s concept, intended for conversion from civilian container ships

== Notes ==
- Friedman, Norman (1985). U.S. Aircraft Carriers: an Illustrated Design History. Naval Institute Press. ISBN 0-87021-739-9.
- Gardiner, Robert; Chumbley, Stephen (1995). Conway's All The World's Fighting Ships 1947–1995. Annapolis, Maryland, US: Naval Institute Press. ISBN 1-55750-132-7.
