= Nimitz-class aircraft carrier =

US Navy nuclear-powered aircraft carrier class

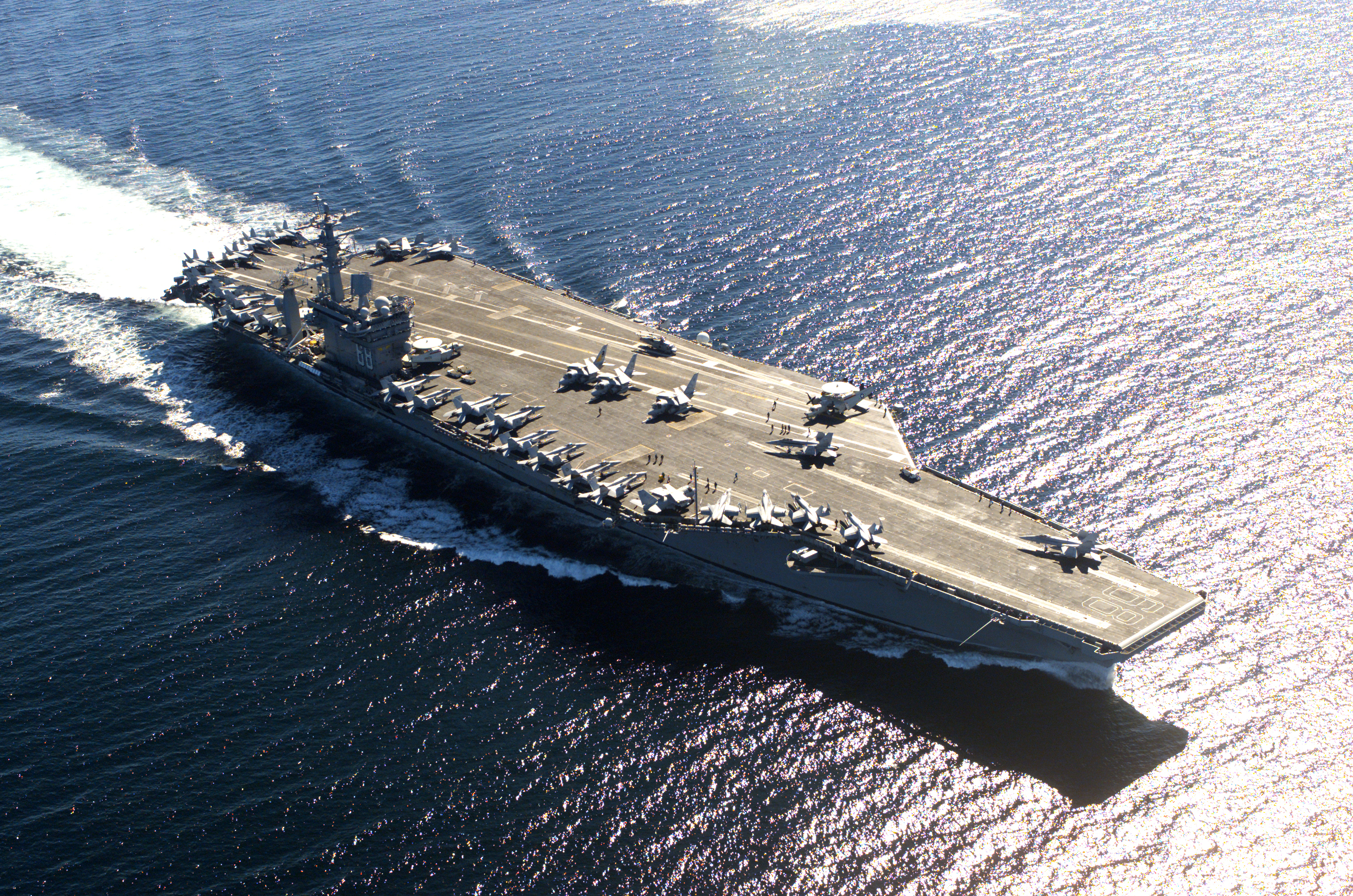
- USS Nimitz (CVN-68), lead ship of the class of supercarriers, at sea near Victoria, British Columbia, after the 1999–2001 refit

Class overview
- Name: Nimitz-class aircraft carrier
- Builders: Newport News Shipbuilding Company
- Operators: United States Navy
- Preceded by: Enterprise class
- Succeeded by: Gerald R. Ford class
- Subclasses: Theodore Roosevelt class and; Ronald Reagan class
- Cost: US$1.98 billion in 1975 ($11.8 billion in 2025)
- Built: 1968–2006
- In service: 1975–present
- In commission: 3 May 1975–present
- Completed: 10
- Active: 10

General characteristics
- Type: Aircraft carrier
- Displacement: 100,000 to 104,600 long tons (101,600–106,300 t) full load
- Length: Overall: 1,092 ft (332.8 m); Waterline: 1,040 ft (317.0 m)
- Beam: Overall: 252 ft (76.8 m); Waterline: 134 ft (40.8 m)
- Draft: Maximum navigational: 37 ft (11.3 m); Limit: 41 ft (12.5 m)
- Propulsion: 2 × Westinghouse A4W nuclear reactors (HEU 93.5%); 4 × steam turbines; 4 × shafts; 260,000 shp (190 MW)
- Speed: 30 knots (56 km/h; 35 mph)+
- Range: Unlimited distance; 20–25 years
- Complement: Ship's company: 3,532; Air wing: 2,480
- Crew: 5,000–5,200 (including airwing)
- Sensors & processing systems: AN/SPS-48E 3-D air search radar; AN/SPS-49(V)5 2-D air search radar; AN/SPQ-9B target acquisition radar; AN/SPN-46 air traffic control radars; AN/SPN-43C air traffic control radar; AN/SPN-41 landing aid radars; 4 × Mk 91 NSSM guidance systems; 4 × Mk 95 radars
- Electronic warfare & decoys: AN/SLQ-32A(V)4 countermeasures suite; SLQ-25A Nixie torpedo countermeasures
- Armament: 2–3 × Mk 29 Guided Missile Launching Systems, 8 × RIM-162 ESSM or RIM-7 Sea Sparrow missiles each; 3–4 × Phalanx CIWS; 2 × Mk 49 Guided Missile Launching Systems, 21 × RIM-116 Rolling Airframe Missiles each; Mk 38 25 mm Machine Gun Systems
- Armor: 2.5 in (64 mm) Kevlar over vital spaces
- Aircraft carried: 85–90 fixed wing and helicopters

The Nimitz class is a class of ten nuclear-powered aircraft carriers in service with the United States Navy. The lead ship of the class is named after World War II United States Pacific Fleet commander Fleet Admiral Chester W. Nimitz, who was the last living U.S. Navy officer to hold the rank. With an overall length of 1,092 ft (333 m) and a full-load displacement of over 100,000 long tons (100,000 t), the Nimitz-class ships were the largest warships built and in service until USS Gerald R. Ford entered the fleet in 2017.

Instead of the gas turbines or diesel–electric systems used for propulsion on many modern warships, the carriers use two A4W nuclear pressurized water reactors. The reactors produce steam to drive steam turbines which drive four propeller shafts and can produce a maximum speed of over 30 knots (56 km/h; 35 mph) and a maximum power of around 260,000 shaft horsepower (190 MW). As a result of nuclear power, the ships are capable of operating for over 20 years without refueling and are predicted to have a service life of over 50 years. They are categorized as nuclear-powered aircraft carriers and are numbered with consecutive hull numbers from CVN-68 to CVN-77. (Note: The letters "CVN" denote the type of ship: "CV" is the hull classification symbol for aircraft carriers, and "N" indicates nuclear-powered propulsion. The number after the "CVN" means that this is the 68th "CV", or large aircraft carrier.)

All ten carriers were constructed by Newport News Shipbuilding Company in Virginia. USS Nimitz, the lead ship of the class, was commissioned on 3 May 1975, and USS George H. W. Bush, the tenth and last of the class, was commissioned on 10 January 2009. Since the 1970s, Nimitz-class carriers have participated in many conflicts and operations across the world, including Operation Eagle Claw in Iran, the Gulf War, and more recently in Iraq and Afghanistan.

The angled flight decks of the carriers use a CATOBAR arrangement to operate aircraft, with steam catapults and arrestor wires for launch and recovery. As well as speeding up flight deck operations, this allows for a much wider variety of aircraft than with the STOVL arrangement used on smaller carriers. An embarked carrier air wing comprising around 64 aircraft is normally deployed on board. The air wings' strike fighters are primarily F/A-18E and F/A-18F Super Hornets. In addition to their aircraft, the vessels carry short-range defensive weaponry for anti-aircraft warfare and missile defense.

The unit cost was about US$8.5 billion in FY 2012 dollars, equal to US$11.8 billion in 2025.

== Description ==
The Nimitz-class aircraft carriers have a length of 1,092 ft (333 m) overall and 1,040 ft (317 m) at the waterline, with a beam of 252 ft (77 m) overall and 134 ft (41 m) at the waterline; the individual ships have slight variations in their dimensions. They were initially designed with a full-load displacement of 87,000 long tons (88,000 t; 97,000 short tons) and a draft of 37 ft (11 m), but the ships would be delivered several thousand tons heavier, particularly for later members of the class. As the vessels were overhauled and installed more equipment, loaded displacement would climb to exceed 100,000 long tons (100,000 t; 110,000 short tons). For example, USS Abraham Lincoln currently displaces 104,112 long tons (105,783 t; 116,605 short tons) at full load. The ships' nominal complement comprises: 3,000–3,200; 1,500 (air wing); and 500 (other).

=== Design ===
The Nimitz-class aircraft carriers were ordered to supplement the aircraft carriers of the Midway, Forrestal, Kitty Hawk and Enterprise classes, maintaining the strength and capability of the U.S. Navy after the older carriers were decommissioned. The ships were designed to be improvements on previous U.S. aircraft carriers, particularly the Enterprise and Forrestal-class supercarriers, although the arrangement of the vessels is relatively similar to that of the Kitty Hawk class. Among other design improvements, the two reactors on Nimitz-class carriers take up less space than the eight reactors used on Enterprise. Along with a more generally improved design, Nimitz-class carriers can carry 90% more aviation fuel and 50% more ordnance when compared to the Forrestal class.

The U.S. Navy has stated that the carriers could withstand three times the damage sustained by the Essex class inflicted by Japanese air attacks during World War II. The hangars on the ships are divided into three fire bays by thick steel doors that are designed to restrict the spread of fire. This addition has been present on U.S. aircraft carriers since World War II, after the fires caused by kamikaze attacks.

The first ships were designed around the time of the Vietnam War, and certain aspects of the design were influenced by operations there. To a certain extent, the carrier operations in Vietnam demonstrated the need for increased capabilities of aircraft carriers over their survivability; they were used to send sorties into the war and were, therefore, less subject to attack. As a result of this experience, Nimitz-class carriers were designed with larger stores of aviation fuel and larger magazines compared to previous carriers, although this was partly a result of increased space available by the new design of the ships' propulsion systems.

A major purpose of the carriers was initially to support the U.S. military during the Cold War. They were designed with capabilities for that role, including using nuclear power instead of oil for greater endurance and the ability to adjust their weapons systems on the basis of new intelligence and technological developments. They were initially categorized only as attack carriers, but ships have been constructed with anti-submarine capabilities since USS Carl Vinson. As a result, the ships and their aircraft can participate in a wide range of operations, including sea and air blockades; mine laying; and missile strikes on land, air, and sea.

Because of a design flaw, ships of this class have inherent lists to starboard when under combat loads that exceed the capability of their list control systems. The problem appears to be especially prevalent on some of the more modern vessels. This problem has been previously rectified by using damage control voids for ballast, but a solution using solid ballast that does not affect the ship's survivability has been proposed.

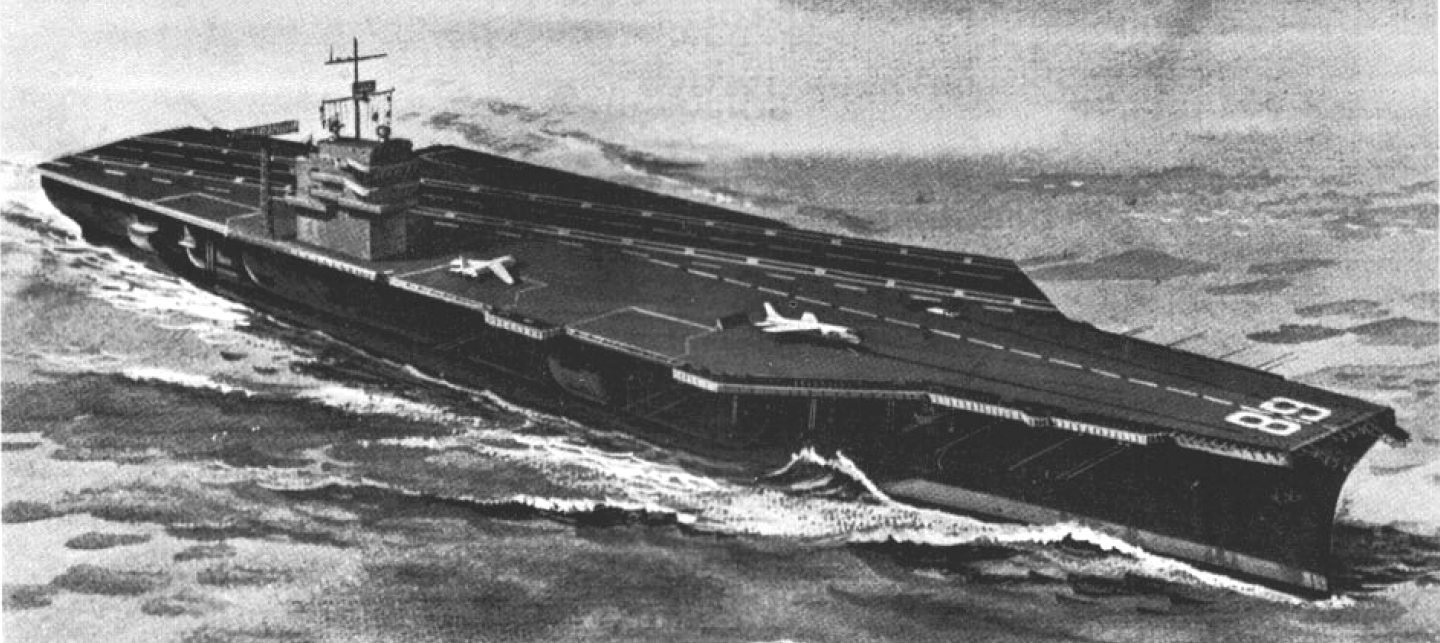
An artist's impression of USS Nimitz in 1968

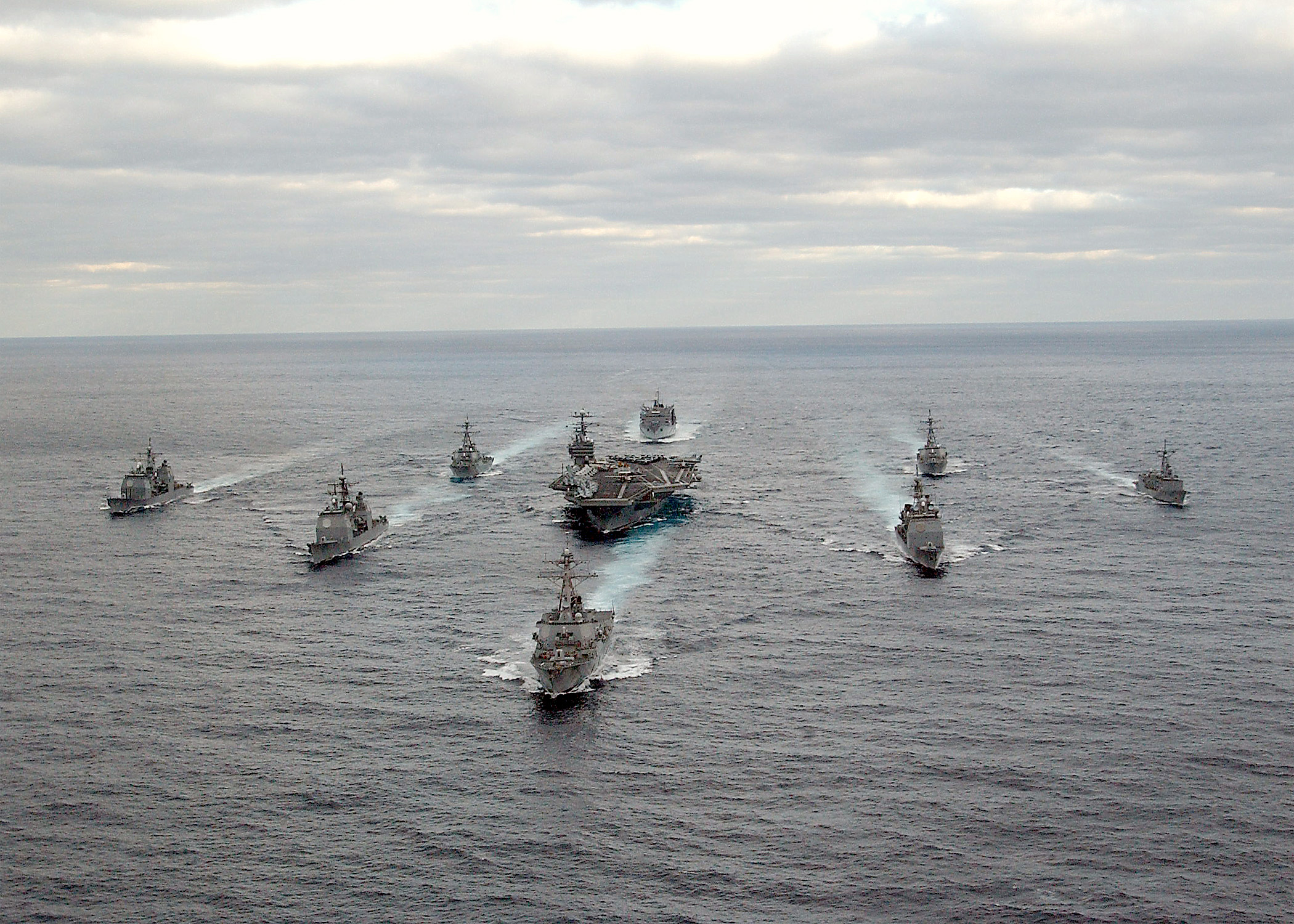
George Washington Carrier Strike Group formation sails in the Atlantic Ocean

=== Construction ===
All ten Nimitz-class carriers were constructed between 1968 and 2006 at Newport News Shipbuilding in Newport News, Virginia. The first three units of the class were erected in Dry Dock 11, the other seven ships were constructed in the largest dry dock in the western hemisphere, Dry Dock 12, now 2,172 feet (662 m) long after a recent expansion.

Beginning with USS Theodore Roosevelt, the aircraft carriers were manufactured with modular construction. This means that whole sections could be welded together with plumbing and electrical equipment already fitted, improving efficiency. The modules were lifted into the dry dock using gantry cranes and welded. In the case of the bow sections, these can weigh over 1,500,000 pounds (680 t). This method was originally developed by Ingalls Shipbuilding and increases the rate of work because much of the fitting out does not have to be carried out within the confines of the already-finished hull.

The total cost of construction for each ship was around $4.5 billion. (Note: All monetary values are adjusted for inflation to 2000s figures)

=== Propulsion ===
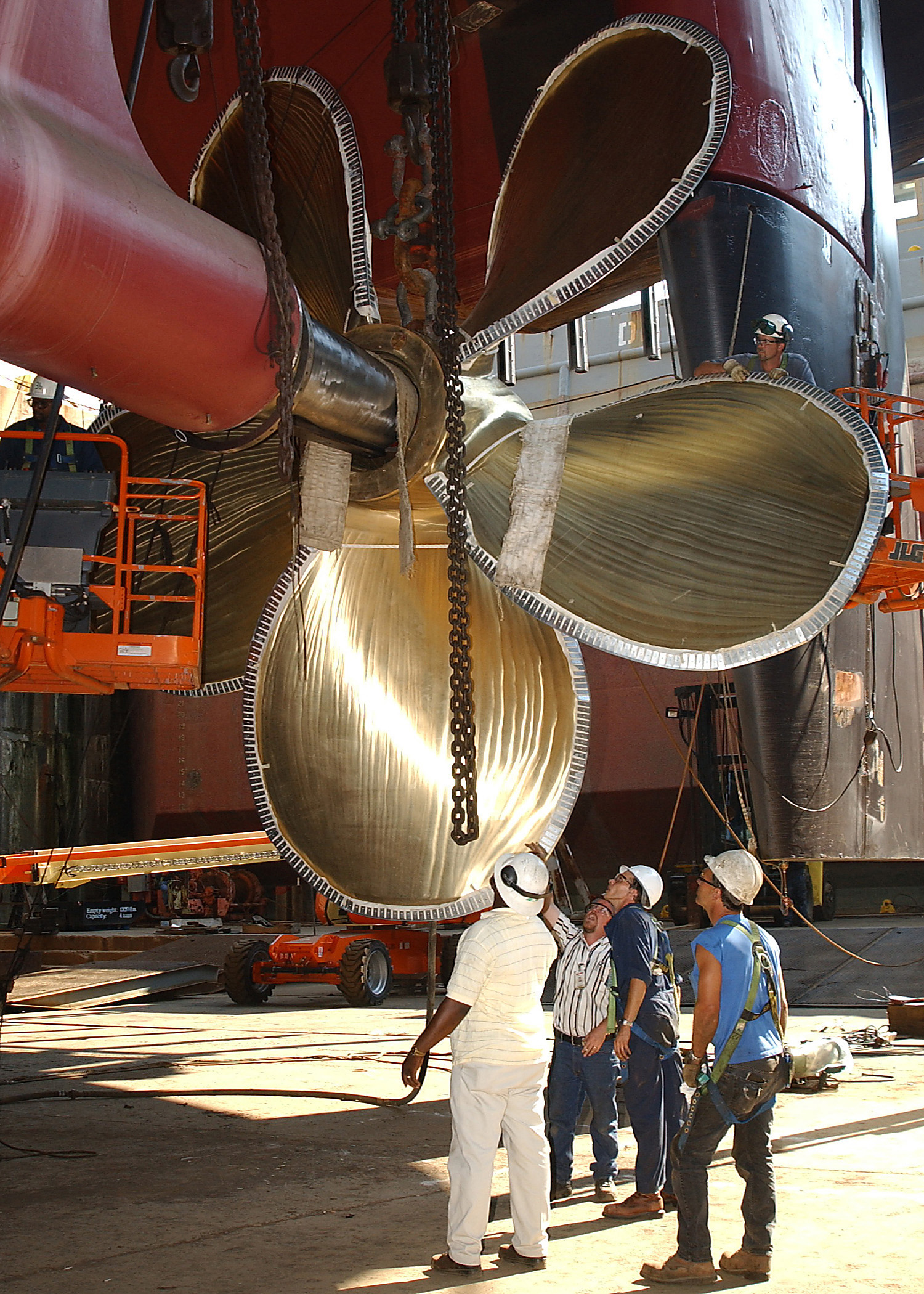
One of the four propellers of George Washington

All ships of the class are powered by two A4W nuclear reactors, housed in separate compartments. The reactors produce heat through nuclear fission, which heats water to produce steam. This is then passed through four turbines, which are shared by the two reactors. A gearbox transmits power to four propeller shafts, producing a maximum speed of over 30 knots (56 km/h) and maximum power of 260,000 brake horsepower (194 MW). The turbines power the four bronze propellers, each with a diameter of 25 feet (7.6 m) and a weight of 66,000 pounds (30 t). Behind these are the two rudders, which are 29 feet (8.8 m) high and 22 feet (6.7 m) long, and each weighs 110,000 pounds (50 metric tons).

The Nimitz-class ships constructed since USS Ronald Reagan also have bulbous bows to improve speed and fuel efficiency by reducing wave-making resistance. As a result of nuclear power, the ships are capable of operating continuously for over 20 years without refueling and are predicted to have a service life of over 50 years.

=== Armament and protection ===
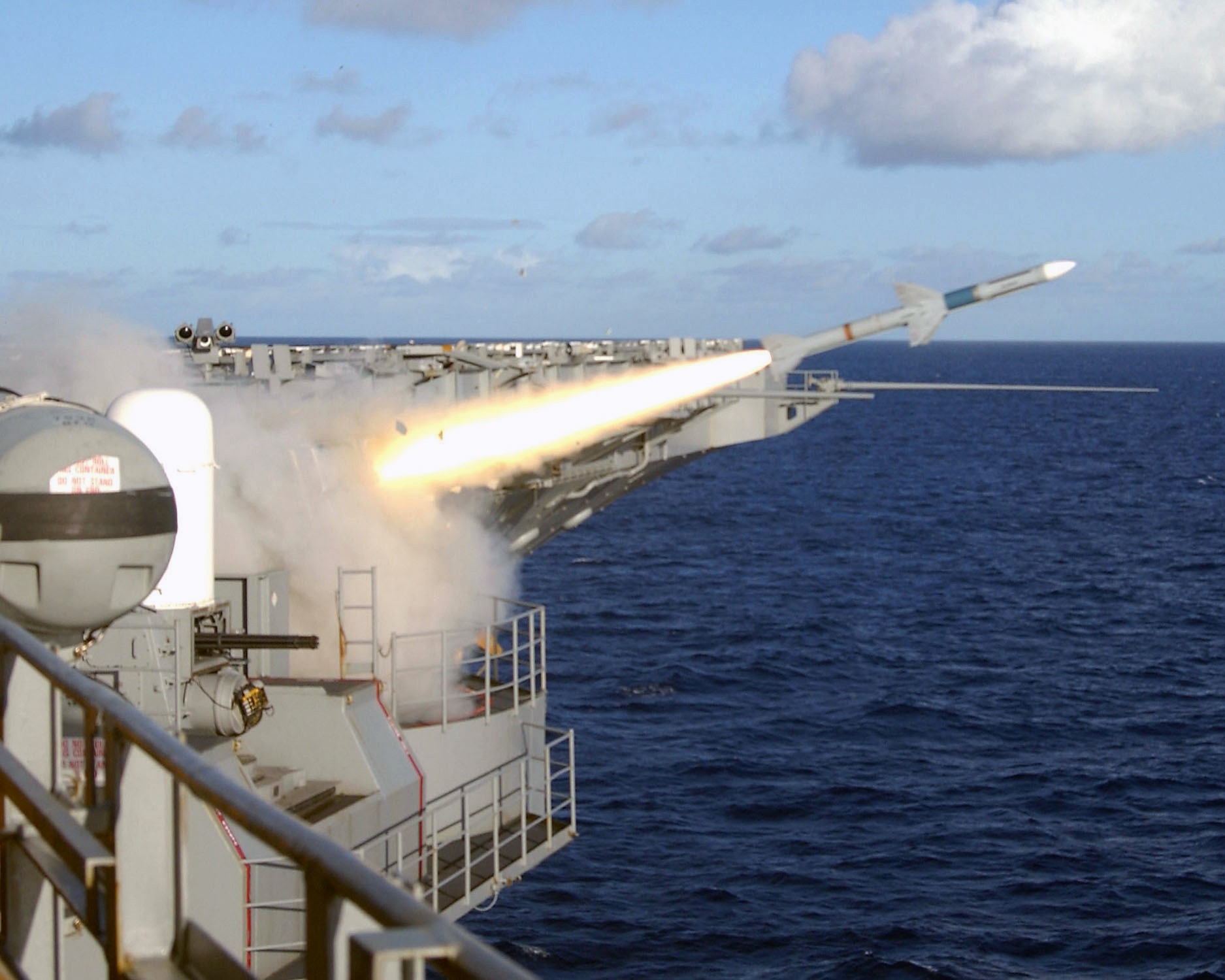
The firing of a Sea Sparrow missile from Theodore Roosevelt. A Phalanx CIWS is in the left of the image.

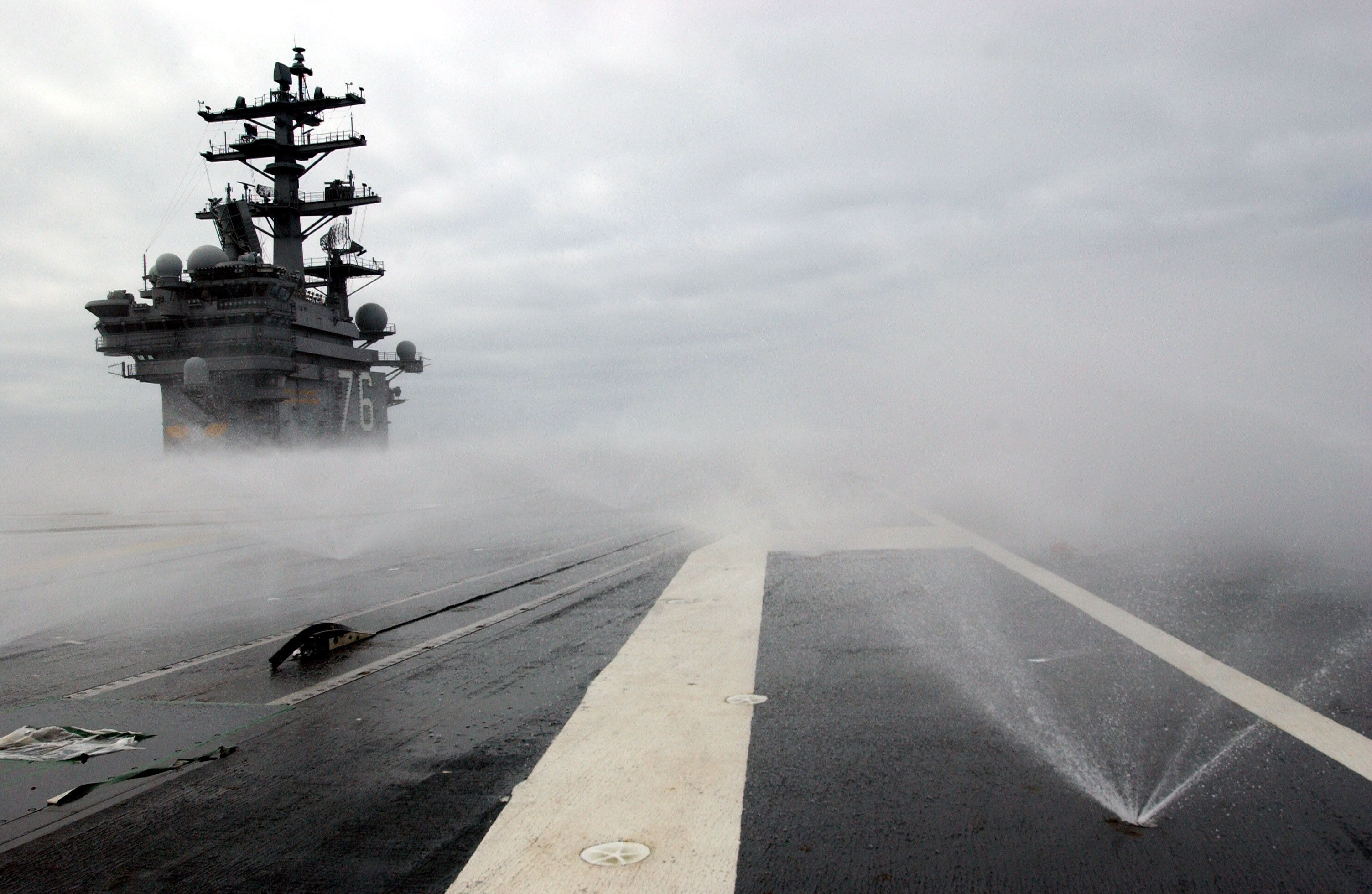
The counter-measure wash-down system of Ronald Reagan being tested. This is part of the ship's defense against chemical, biological or radiological threats, and also against fires

In addition to the aircraft carried on board, the ships carry defensive equipment for use against missiles and hostile aircraft. These consist of either two or three RIM-7 Sea Sparrow or RIM-162 Evolved SeaSparrow Missile Mk 29 missile launchers designed for defense against aircraft and anti-ship missiles, as well as either three or four 20 mm Phalanx CIWS.

USS Ronald Reagan has none of these, having been built with the Mk 49 Guided Missile Launching Systems for RIM-116 Rolling Airframe Missiles, two of which have also been installed on USS Nimitz and USS George Washington. These will be installed on the other ships as they return for Refueling Complex Overhaul (RCOH). Since USS Theodore Roosevelt, the carriers have been constructed with 2.5 in (64 mm) Kevlar armor over vital spaces, and earlier ships have been retrofitted with it: Nimitz in 1983–1984, Dwight D. Eisenhower from 1985 to 1987 and Carl Vinson in 1989.

The ships' other countermeasures are four Sippican SRBOC (super rapid bloom off-board chaff) six-barrel Mk 36 decoy launchers, which deploy infrared flares and chaff to disrupt the sensors of incoming missiles; an SSTDS torpedo defense system; and an AN/SLQ-25 Nixie torpedo countermeasures system. The carriers also use AN/SLQ-32(V) jamming systems to detect and disrupt hostile radar signals in addition to the electronic warfare capabilities of some of the aircraft on board.

The presence of nuclear weapons on board U.S. aircraft carriers since the end of the Cold War has neither been confirmed nor denied by the U.S. government. As a result, the presence of a U.S. aircraft carrier in a foreign port has occasionally provoked protest from local people, for example, when Nimitz visited Chennai, India, in 2007. At that time, the Strike Group commander Rear Admiral John Terence Blake stated, "The U.S. policy [...] is that we do not routinely deploy nuclear weapons on board Nimitz."

In May 2013, George H. W. Bush conducted the first carrier-borne end-to-end at-sea test of the Surface Ship Torpedo Defense System (SSTDS). The SSTDS combined the passive detection of the Torpedo Warning System (TWS) that finds, classifies, and tracks torpedoes with the hard-kill capability of a Countermeasure Anti-Torpedo (CAT), an encapsulated miniature torpedo designed to locate, home in on, and destroy hostile torpedoes. This was to increase protection against wake-homing torpedoes like the Type 53 that do not respond to acoustic decoys. The pieces of the SSTDS were engineered to locate and destroy incoming torpedoes in a matter of seconds; each system included one TWS and 8 CATs. Initial operational capability (IOC) was planned for 2019, and all aircraft carriers were to be outfitted by 2035. The Navy suspended work on the project in September 2018 due to poor reliability of the components; hardware, already installed on five carriers, is to be removed by 2023.

=== Carrier air wing ===
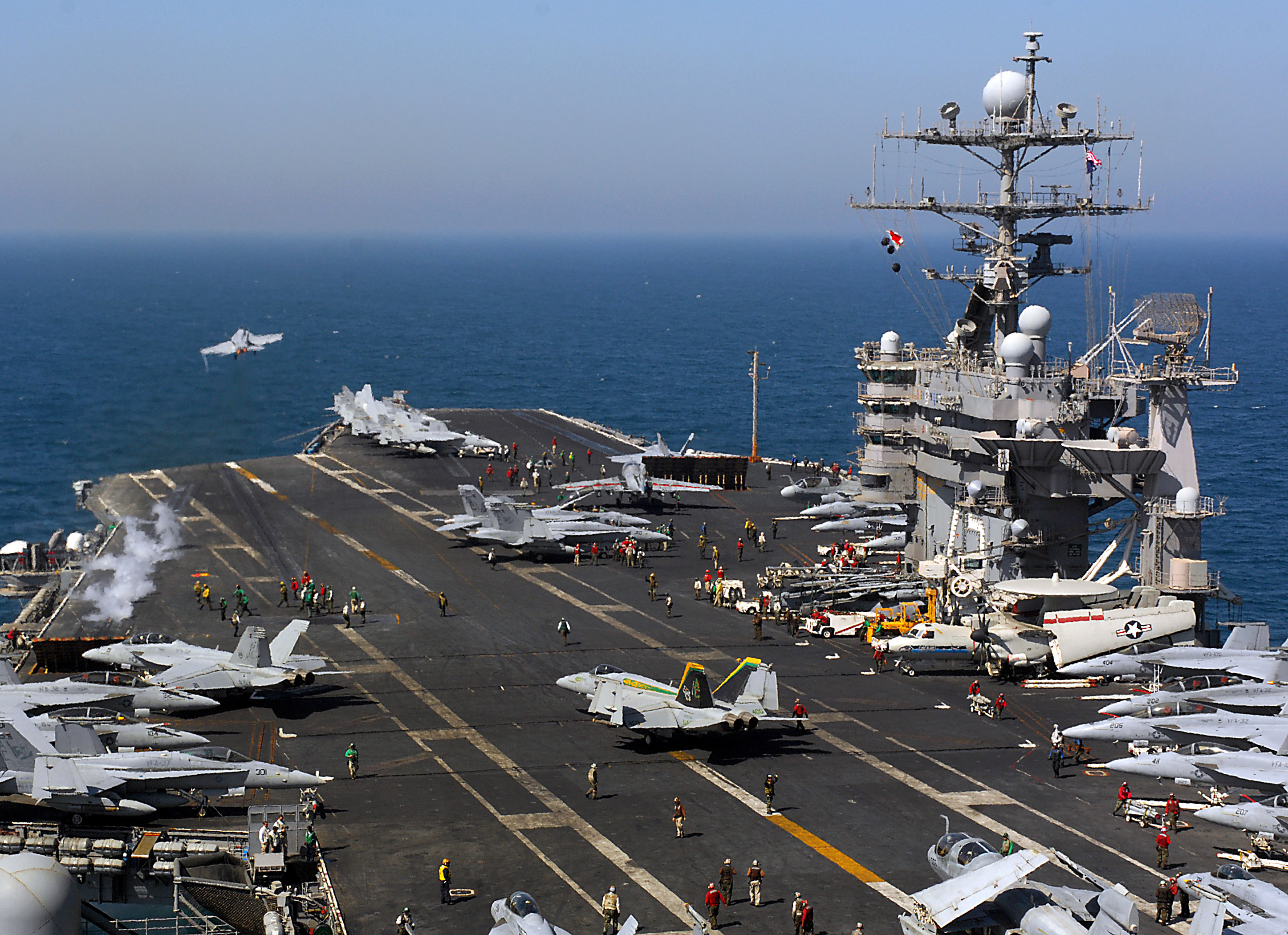
An F/A-18 Hornet launches from the flight deck of Harry S. Truman. Other aircraft are stored on deck.

In order for a carrier to deploy, it must embark one of ten Carrier Air Wings (CVW). (Note: Although there are ten carrier air wings in the U.S. Navy, they are numbered between CVW-1 (USS Enterprise) and CVW-17 (USS Carl Vinson).) The carriers can accommodate a maximum of 130 F/A-18 Hornets or 85–90 aircraft of different types, but current numbers are typically 64 aircraft. Although the air wings are integrated with the operation of the carriers they are deployed to, they are regarded as separate entities. As well as the aircrew, the air wings are also made up of support personnel involved in roles including maintenance, aircraft and ordnance handling, and emergency procedures. Each person on the flight deck wears color-coded clothing to make their role easily identifiable.

A typical carrier air wing includes 36-48 F/A-18E or F Super Hornets as strike fighters, split between 3-4 squadrons; up to 12 F-35Cs, contributed by a squadron of Navy or Marine aviation; 4–8 EA-18G Growlers for electronic warfare; 4–6 E-2D Hawkeyes for airborne early warning (AEW), 1-3 C-2 Greyhounds used for logistics (to be replaced by CMV-22 Ospreys); and a Helicopter Anti-Submarine Squadron of 6–8 MH-60R and MH-60S Seahawks and 'Knighthawks', respectively. Marine F/A-18C or D Hornet squadrons are also sometimes deployed in place of F/A-18E/F Super Hornet and/or F-35C squadrons. Future aircraft planned for operation from Nimitz and future classes of aircraft carrier include the MQ-25 Stingray, and two squadrons of F-35C, replacing a F/A-18E/F Super Hornet squadron. Aircraft previously operated from Nimitz-class carriers include F-4 Phantoms, RA-5C Vigilantes, RF-8G Crusaders, F-14 Tomcats, S-3 Vikings, EA-3B Skywarriors, EA-6B Prowlers, A-7 Corsair II, and A-6E Intruder aircraft.

=== Flight deck and aircraft facilities ===
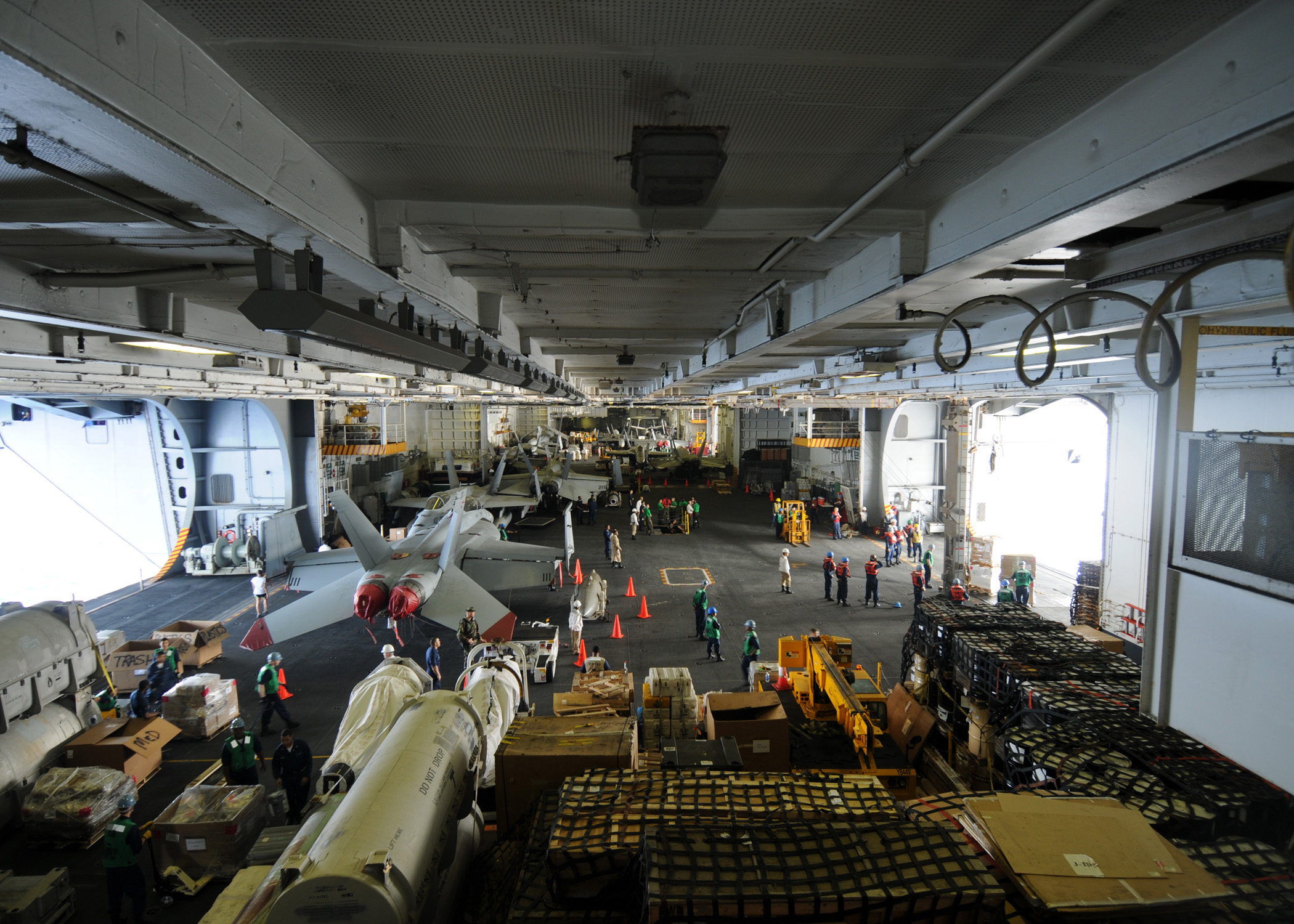
The hangar of George Washington during a replenishment at sea, 2009

The flight deck is angled at nine degrees, which allows for aircraft to be launched and recovered simultaneously. This angle of the flight deck was reduced slightly compared to previous carriers, as the current design improves the airflow around the carrier. Four steam catapults are used to launch fixed-wing aircraft, and four arrestor wires are used for recovery. The two newest carriers, Ronald Reagan and George H. W. Bush, have only three arrestor wires each, as the fourth was used infrequently on earlier ships and was therefore deemed unnecessary.

This CATOBAR arrangement allows for faster launching and recovery as well as a much wider range of aircraft that can be used on board compared with smaller aircraft carriers, most of which use a simpler STOVL arrangement without catapults or arrestor wires. The ship's aircraft operations are controlled by the air boss from Primary Flight Control or Pri-Fly. Four large elevators transport aircraft between the flight deck and the hangars below. These hangars are divided into three bays by thick steel doors that are designed to restrict the spread of fire.

=== Strike groups ===
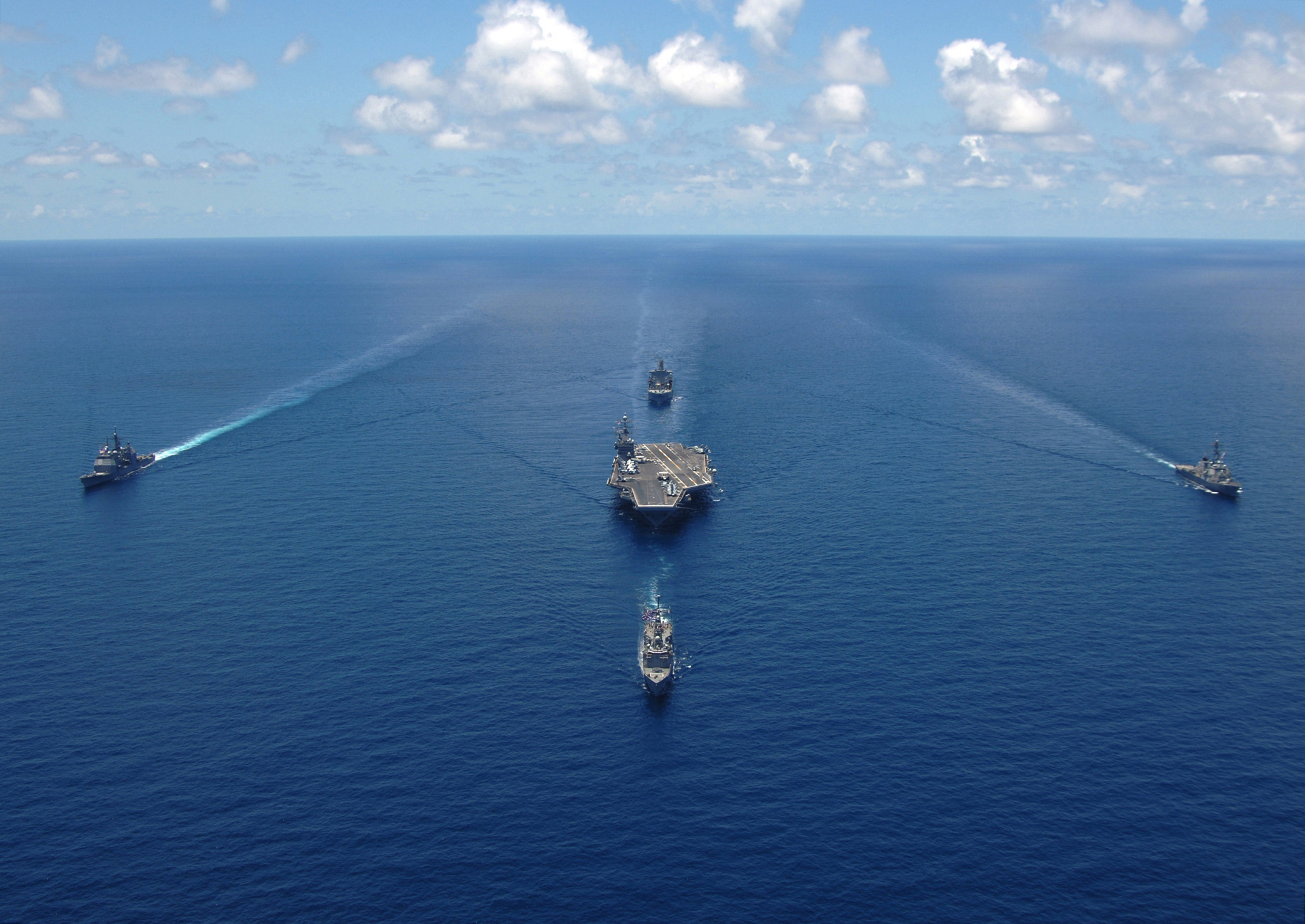
The George Washington carrier strike group in the Caribbean Sea, 2006

When an aircraft carrier deploys, it takes a Carrier Strike Group (CSG), made up of several other warships and supply vessels that allow the operation to be carried out. The armament of the Nimitz class is made up only of short-range defensive weapons, used as a last line of defense against enemy missiles and aircraft. As with all surface ships, an aircraft carrier is particularly vulnerable to attack from below, specifically from submarines. An aircraft carrier is a very expensive, hard to replace, and strategically valuable asset, and therefore it logically has immense value as a target.

As a result of its target value and vulnerability, aircraft carriers are always escorted by at least one submarine for protection. The other vessels in the Strike Group provide additional capabilities, such as long-range Tomahawk missiles or the Aegis Combat System, and protect the carrier from attack. A typical Strike Group may include, in addition to an aircraft carrier: up to six surface combatants, including guided-missile cruisers and guided-missile destroyers, used primarily for anti-aircraft warfare and anti-submarine warfare, and frigates/guided-missile frigates, prior to their retirement from USN service. Guided missile frigates will again accompany CSGs when the Navy commissions the USS Constellation (FFG-62), the lead ship of the Constellation-class. Also making up part of the group is one or two attack submarines for seeking out and destroying hostile surface ships and submarines and an ammunition, oiler, and supply ship from Military Sealift Command to provide logistical support. The numbers and types of vessels that make up each strike group can vary from group to group, depending on deployments, mission, and availability.

=== Design differences within the class ===
While the designs of the last seven ships, beginning with Theodore Roosevelt, differ slightly from those of the earlier ships, the U.S. Navy considers all ten carriers a single class. When the older carriers come in for Refueling and Complex Overhaul (RCOH), their nuclear power plants are refueled, and they are upgraded to the standards of the later carriers. Other modifications may be performed to update the ships' equipment.

The ships were initially classified only as attack carriers but have been constructed with anti-submarine capabilities since Carl Vinson. These improvements include more advanced radar systems and facilities enabling the ships to operate aircraft in a more effective anti-submarine warfare role, including fitting common undersea picture (CUP) technology, which uses sonar to allow for better assessment of the threat from submarines.

Theodore Roosevelt and later carriers have slight structural differences from the earlier Nimitz carriers, such as improved protection for ordnance stored in their magazines. Other improvements include upgraded flight deck ballistic protection, first installed on George Washington, and the high-strength low-alloy steel (HSLA-100) used for constructing ships starting with John C. Stennis. More recently, older ships have had their flight decks upgraded with a new non-slip material fitted on new-build ships to improve safety for crew members and aircraft.

The last carrier of the class, George H. W. Bush, was designed as a "transition ship" from the Nimitz class to the replacement Gerald R. Ford class. George H. W. Bush incorporates new technologies, including improved propeller and bulbous bow designs, a reduced radar cross-section, and electronic and environmental upgrades. The ship's cost was $6.2 billion. The earlier Nimitz-class ships each cost around $4.5 billion. To lower costs, some new technologies and design features were also incorporated into USS Ronald Reagan, the previous carrier, including a redesigned island.

== Ships in class ==
The United States Navy lists the following ten ships in the Nimitz class:

List of Nimitz-class aircraft carriers
Ship	Hull No.	Subclass	Laid down	Launched	Commissioned	Refueling and Overhaul	Homeport	Refs.
Nimitz	CVN-68	Nimitz subclass	22 June 1968	13 May 1972	3 May 1975	1998–2001	Naval Base Kitsap, Bremerton, Washington	
Dwight D. Eisenhower (ex-Eisenhower)	CVN-69	Nimitz subclass	15 August 1970	11 October 1975	18 October 1977	2001–2005	Naval Station Norfolk, Norfolk, Virginia	
Carl Vinson	CVN-70	Nimitz subclass	11 October 1975	15 March 1980	13 March 1982	2005–2009	Naval Air Station North Island, Coronado California	
Theodore Roosevelt	CVN-71	Theodore Roosevelt subclass	31 October 1981	27 October 1984	25 October 1986	2009–2013	Naval Air Station North Island, Coronado, California	
Abraham Lincoln	CVN-72	Theodore Roosevelt subclass	3 November 1984	13 February 1988	11 November 1989	2013–2017	Naval Air Station North Island, Coronado, California	
George Washington	CVN-73	Theodore Roosevelt subclass	25 August 1986	21 July 1990	4 July 1992	2017–2023	Yokosuka Naval Base, Yokosuka, Japan	
John C. Stennis	CVN-74	Theodore Roosevelt subclass	13 March 1991	11 November 1993	9 December 1995	2021–	Naval Station Norfolk, Norfolk, Virginia (In RCOH at Newport News Shipbuilding, Newport News, Virginia)	
Harry S. Truman (ex-United States)	CVN-75	Theodore Roosevelt subclass	29 November 1993	7 September 1996	25 July 1998	2026 -	Naval Station Norfolk, Norfolk, Virginia (In RCOH at Newport News Shipbuilding, Newport News, Virginia)	
Ronald Reagan	CVN-76	Ronald Reagan subclass	12 February 1998	4 March 2001	12 July 2003	—N/a	Naval Base Kitsap, Bremerton, Washington	
George H. W. Bush	CVN-77	Ronald Reagan subclass	6 September 2003	9 October 2006	10 January 2009	—N/a	Naval Station Norfolk, Norfolk, Virginia	

== Service history ==
=== 1975–1989 ===
One of the first major operations in which the ships were involved was Operation Eagle Claw launched by Nimitz in 1980 after she had deployed to the Indian Ocean in response to the taking of hostages in the U.S. embassy in Tehran. Although initially part of the U.S. Atlantic Fleet, Dwight D. Eisenhower relieved Nimitz in this operation after her service in the Mediterranean Sea. Nimitz conducted a Freedom of Navigation exercise alongside the aircraft carrier USS Forrestal in August 1981 in the Gulf of Sidra, near Libya. During this exercise, two of the ship's F-14 Tomcats shot down two Libyan aircraft in what became known as the Gulf of Sidra incident. Both Nimitz and Dwight D. Eisenhower conducted contingency operations off Lebanon in support of the Multinational Force in Lebanon. Dwight D. Eisenhower operated off the coast of Libya during Operation Arid Farmer, the code-name for U.S. military assistance to Sudan, Egypt and the government of Hissène Habré of Chad during the Chadian-Libyan conflict. Nimitz operated off the coast of Lebanon after the hijacking of TWA Flight 847. In 1987, Carl Vinson participated in the first U.S. carrier deployment in the Bering Sea, and Nimitz provided security during the 1988 Olympic Games in Seoul. Both Nimitz and Carl Vinson participated in Operation Earnest Will, the escort of U.S. flagged tankers in the Persian Gulf.

=== 1990–2000 ===
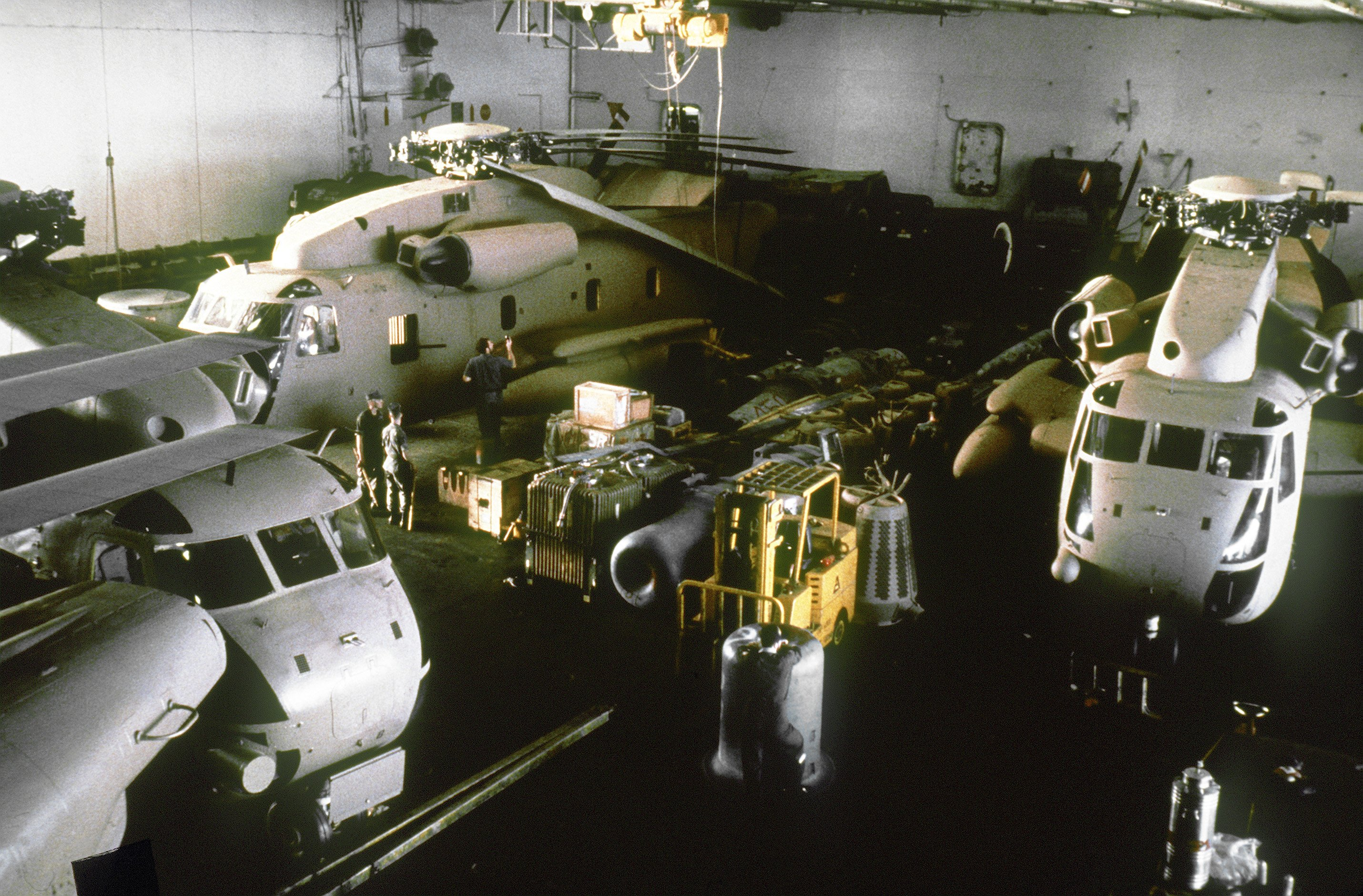
USN RH-53D Sea Stallion helicopters aboard Nimitz in early 1980, prior to execution of Operation Eagle Claw

The two most significant deployments the Nimitz class was involved in during the 1990s were the Gulf War and its aftermath and Operation Southern Watch in southern Iraq. All active vessels were engaged in both of these to some extent, with Operation Southern Watch continuing until 2003. Most carriers in operation in Operation Desert Shield and Operation Desert Storm played supporting roles, with only Theodore Roosevelt playing an active part in combat operations.

Throughout the 1990s and more recently, Nimitz-class carriers have been deployed as part of humanitarian missions. While deployed in the Gulf War, Abraham Lincoln was diverted to the Pacific Ocean to participate alongside 22 other ships in Operation Fiery Vigil, evacuating civilians following the eruption of Mount Pinatubo on Luzon Island in the Philippines. In October 1993, Abraham Lincoln deployed to Somalia to assist UN humanitarian operations there, spending four weeks flying patrols around Mogadishu while supporting U.S. troops during Operation Restore Hope. The same ship also participated in Operation Vigilant Sentinel in the Persian Gulf in 1995.

Dwight D. Eisenhower participated in Operation Uphold Democracy, the US effort to restore the democratically elected government of Haiti, stationing the 10th Mountain Division on board.

Theodore Roosevelt flew patrols in support of the Kurds over northern Iraq as part of Operation Provide Comfort in 1991. In 1995, Theodore Roosevelt participated in Operation Deliberate Force participating alongside other NATO air forces. In 1996, George Washington played a peacekeeping role in Operation Decisive Endeavor in Bosnia and Herzegovina. In 1998, Carl Vinson participated in Operation Desert Fox. In 1999, Theodore Roosevelt was called to the Ionian Sea to support Operation Allied Force alongside other NATO militaries.

=== 2001–present ===
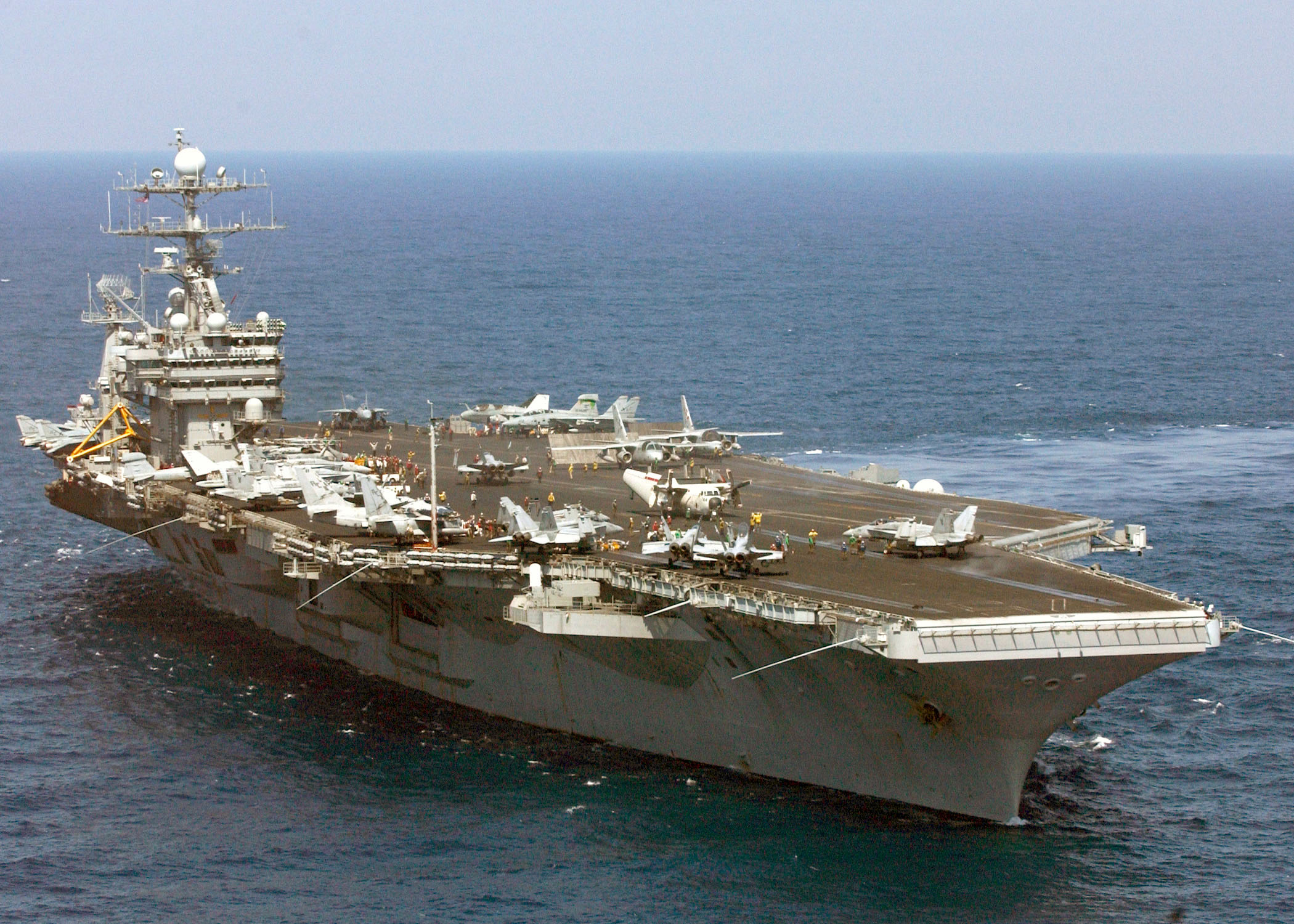
Harry S. Truman engaging in flight operations during Operation Iraqi Freedom

Harry S. Truman's maiden deployment was in November 2000. The carrier's air wing flew 869 combat sorties in support of Operation Southern Watch, including a strike on Iraqi air defense sites on 16 February 2001, in response to Iraqi surface-to-air missile fire against United Nations coalition forces.

After the September 11 attacks, Carl Vinson and Theodore Roosevelt were among the first warships to participate in Operation Enduring Freedom in Afghanistan. Carl Vinson sailed towards the Persian Gulf intending to support Operation Southern Watch in July 2001. This changed in response to the attacks, and the ship changed course to travel towards the North Arabian Sea, where she launched the first airstrikes in support of the operation on 7 October 2001.

Following the attacks, John C. Stennis and George Washington participated in Operation Noble Eagle, carrying out homeland security operations off the West Coast of the United States. All active ships have been involved in Iraq and Afghanistan since that time. This included the invasion in 2003, as well as providing subsequent support for Operation Iraqi Freedom since then.

The carriers have also provided aid after natural disasters. In 2005, Abraham Lincoln supported Operation Unified Assistance in Indonesia after the December 2004 tsunami, and Harry S. Truman provided aid after Hurricane Katrina later in 2005.

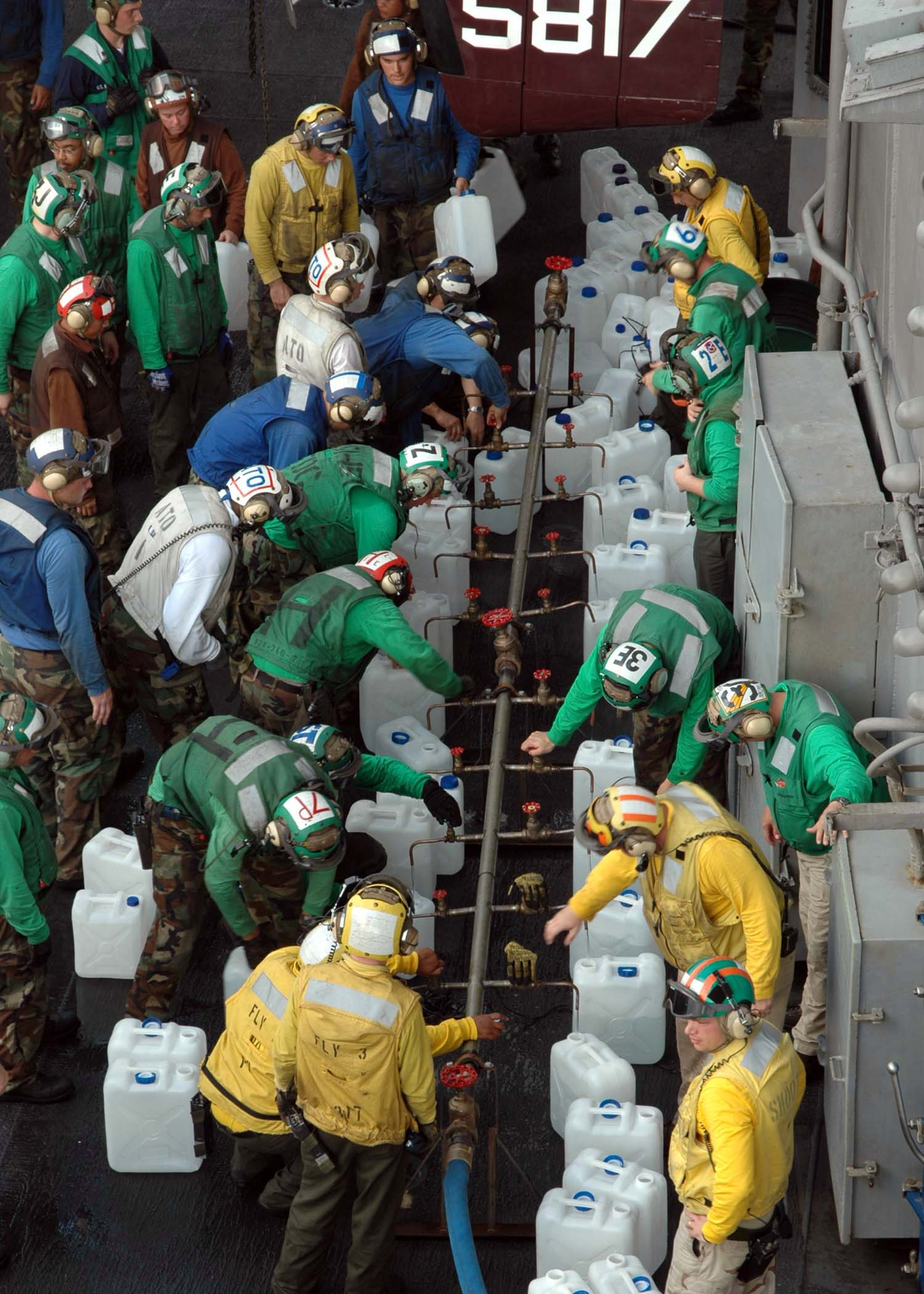
Crew of Abraham Lincoln filling water containers while deployed to assist humanitarian efforts in the aftermath of 2004 Indian Ocean tsunami

The Ronald Reagan Carrier Strike Group performed humanitarian assistance and disaster relief operations in the Philippines in June 2008 after Typhoon Fengshen, which killed hundreds from the central island regions and the main island of Luzon. In January 2010, Carl Vinson operated off Haiti, providing aid and drinking water to earthquake survivors as part of the U.S.-led Operation Unified Response, alongside other major warships and hospital ship Comfort.

The carriers, George H. W. Bush, Harry S. Truman, Dwight D. Eisenhower, Theodore Roosevelt, John C. Stennis and Abraham Lincoln participated in Operation Inherent Resolve.

=== Refueling Complex Overhaul ===
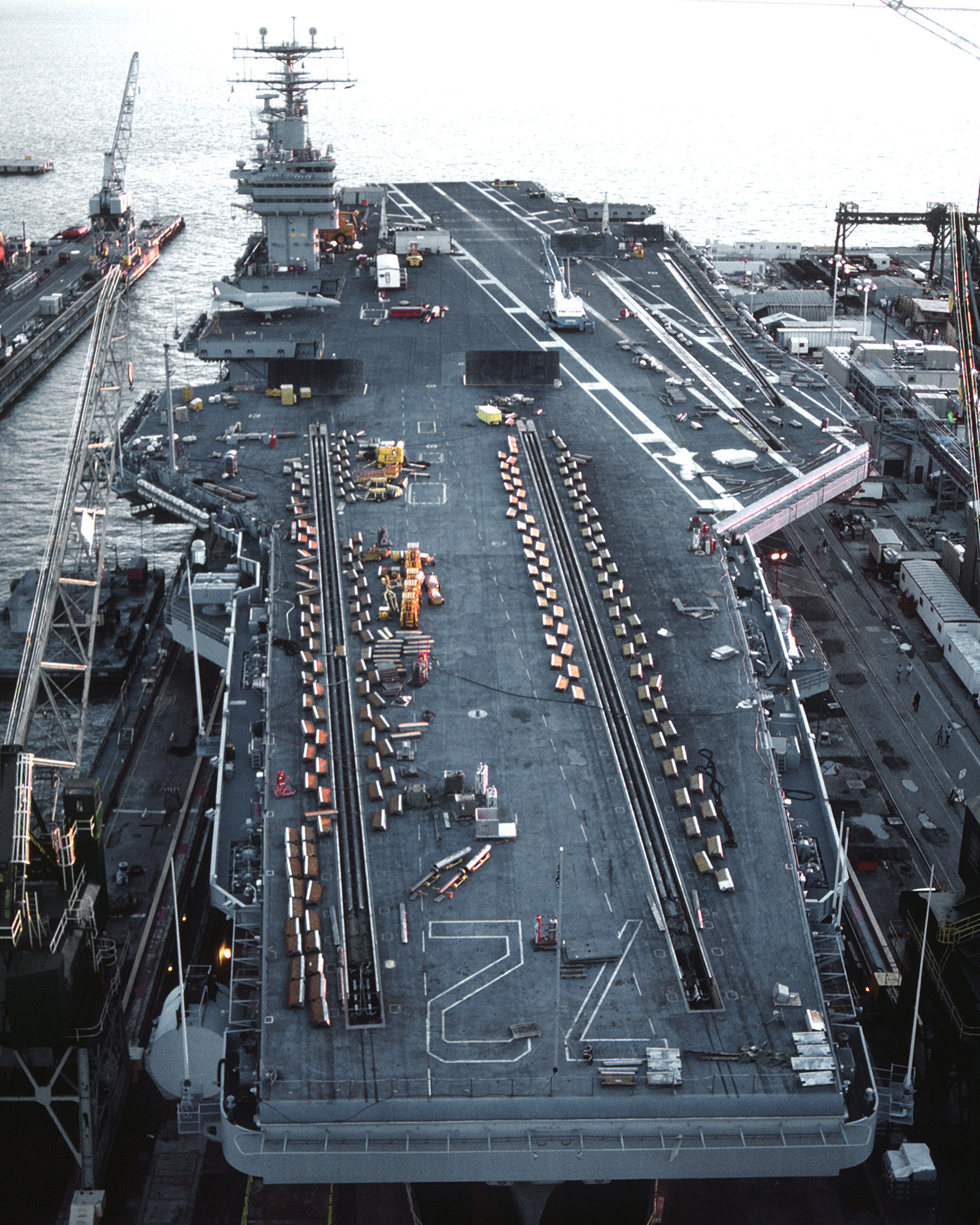
Abraham Lincoln in dry dock, 1990

In order to refuel their nuclear power plants, the carriers each undergo a Refueling and Overhaul (RCOH) once in their service lives. This is also the most substantial overhaul the ships undergo while in service and involves bringing the vessels' equipment up to the standards of the newest ships. The ship is placed in a dry dock, and essential maintenance is carried out, including painting the hull below the waterline and replacing electrical and mechanical components such as valves. Because of the large time periods between the ships' constructions, the armament and designs of the newer ships are more modern than those of the older ships. In RCOH, the older ships are refitted to the standards of the newer ships, which can include upgrades to the flight deck, aircraft catapults, combat systems, and radar systems; precise details can vary significantly between the ships. The improvements normally take around four years to complete. The RCOH for USS Theodore Roosevelt took four years to complete (2009–2013) and cost about $2.6 billion. Planned Incremental Availability is a similar procedure, although it is less substantial and does not involve refueling the nuclear power plants.

=== Symbolic and diplomatic roles ===
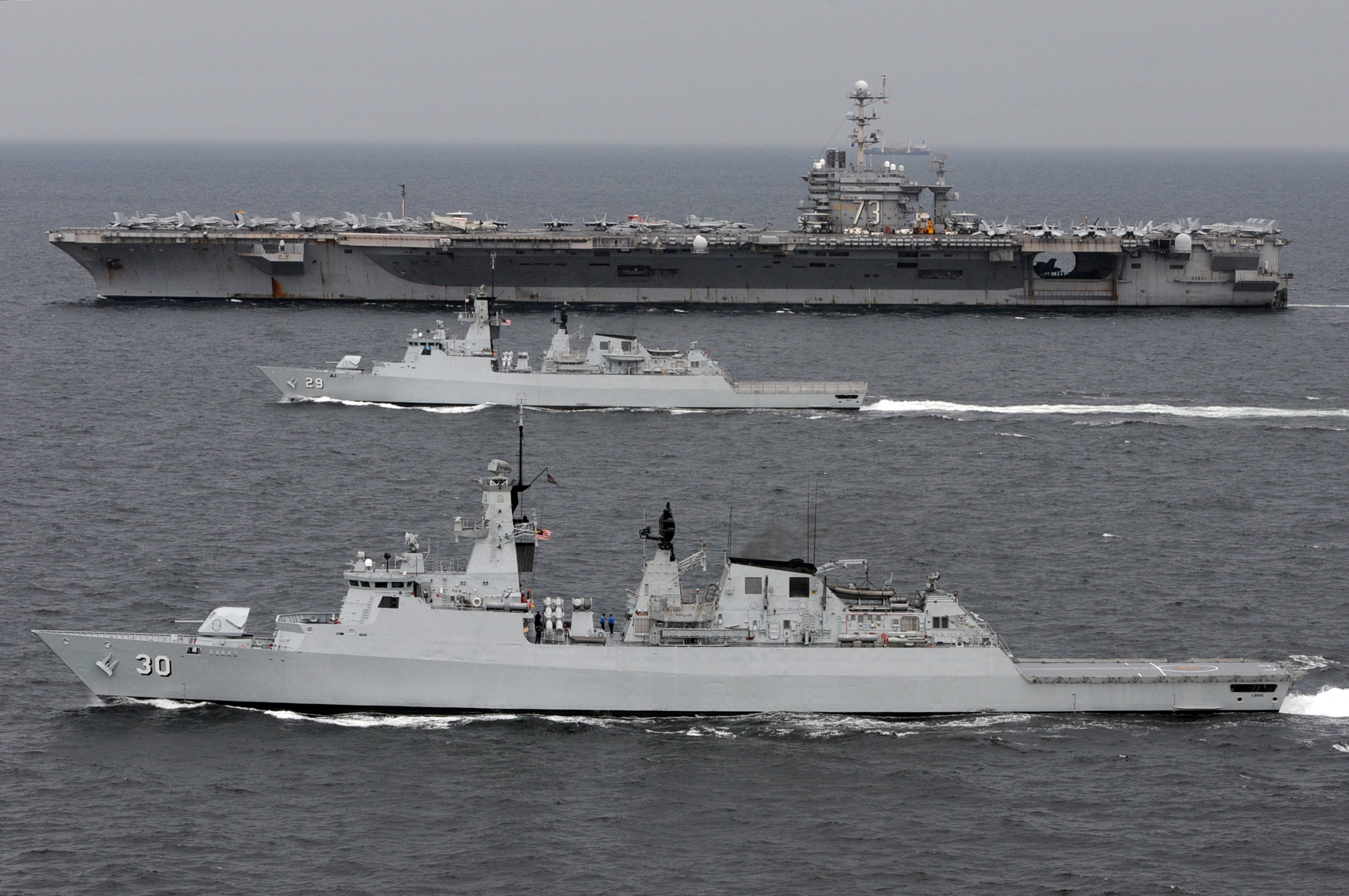
George Washington underway with the Royal Malaysian Navy Lekiu-class frigates KD Jebat and KD Lekiu during a transit of the Andaman Sea

Because of their status as the largest warships in the U.S. Navy, the deployment of an aircraft carrier can fulfill a symbolic role, not just as a deterrent to an enemy but often as a diplomatic tool in strengthening relations with allies and potential allies. The latter of these functions can occur either as a single visit to a country, in which senior naval officers are allowed to observe the operation of the carrier and interact with its senior officers, or as part of an international task force. This can be in combat operations, such as the NATO bombing of Yugoslavia in 1999, or training deployments, such as Exercise RIMPAC. In addition, carriers have participated in international Maritime security operations, combating piracy in the Persian Gulf and off the coast of Somalia.

=== Accidents and incidents ===
On 26 May 1981, an EA-6B Prowler crashed on the flight deck of Nimitz, killing 14 crewmen and injuring 45 others. Forensic testing of the personnel involved showed that several tested positive for marijuana. While this was not found to have directly caused the crash, the investigation's findings prompted the introduction of mandatory drug testing of all service personnel.

Pilots have been able to eject safely in several cases of ditched aircraft. However, fatal aircraft crashes have occurred; in 1994, Lieutenant Kara Hultgreen, the first female F-14 Tomcat pilot, was killed while attempting to land on board Abraham Lincoln during a training exercise.

Fires have also caused damage to the ships; in May 2008, while rotating through to her new homeport at Yokosuka Naval Base in Yokosuka, Japan, George Washington suffered a fire that cost $70 million in repairs, injured 37 sailors and led to the ship undergoing three months of repairs at San Diego; this led to its having to miss the 2008 RIMPAC exercises and delayed the final withdrawal from service of USS Kitty Hawk. The fire was caused by unauthorized smoking near improperly stored flammable refrigerant compressor oil.

== Future and planned replacement ==
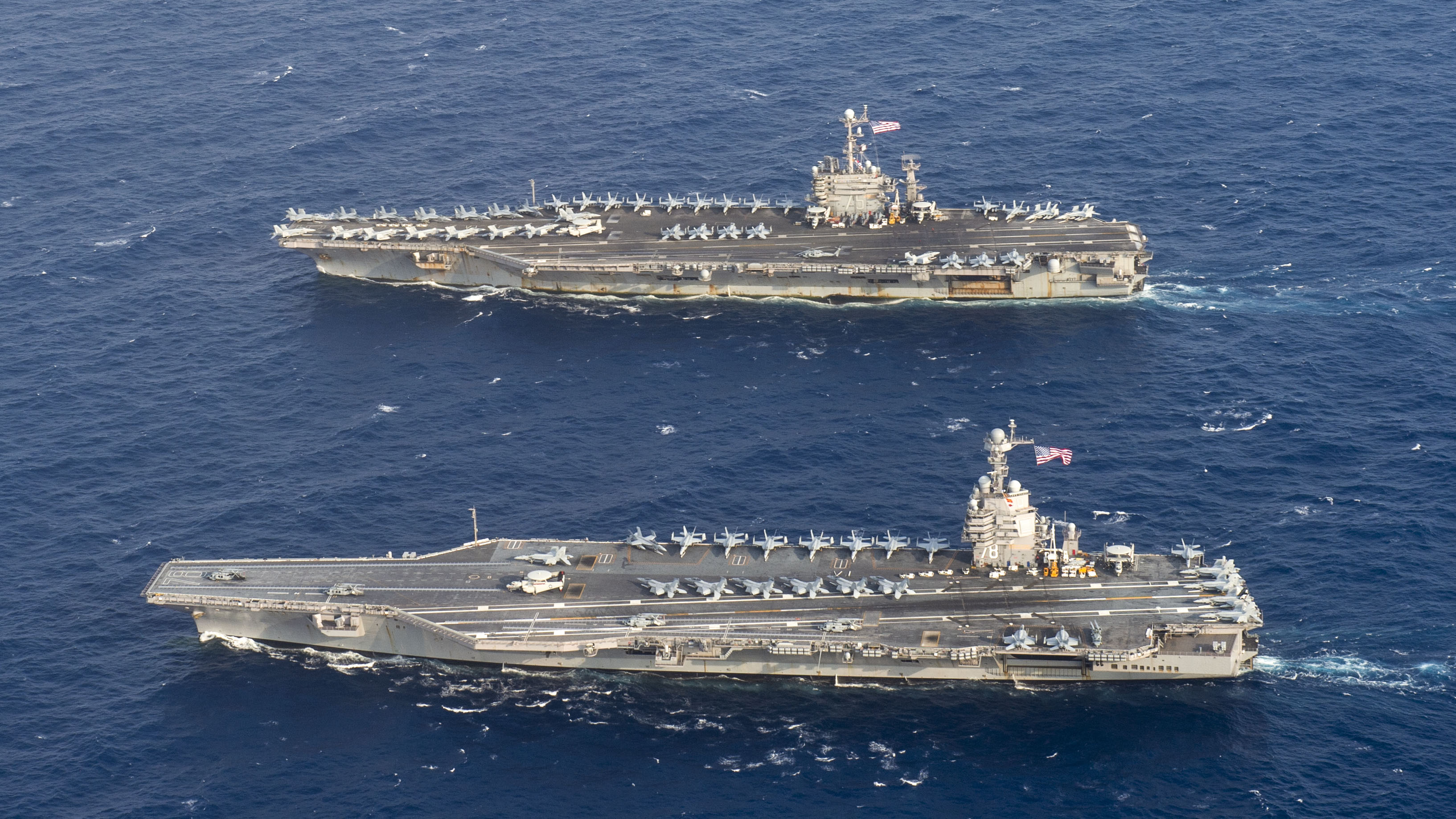
Aerial view of USS Harry S. Truman (CVN-75) alongside USS Gerald R. Ford (CVN-78), the lead ship of the follow-on Gerald R. Ford class

Nimitz-class carriers were initially designed to have a 50-year service life. At the end of their service life, ships will be decommissioned. This process will first take place on Nimitz and is estimated to cost from $750 to $900 million. This compares with an estimated $53 million for a conventionally powered carrier. Most of the difference in cost is attributed to the deactivation of the nuclear power plants and the safe removal of radioactive material and other contaminated equipment.

A new class of carriers, the Gerald R. Ford class, is being constructed to replace previous vessels after decommissioning. Ten of these are expected, and the first has entered service as of 22 July 2017 to replace Enterprise. Most of the rest of these new carriers are to replace the oldest Nimitz ships as they reach the end of their service lives. The new carriers will have a similar design to George H. W. Bush (using an almost identical hull shape) and technological and structural improvements.

The Navy reported in early 2022 that it was conducting a study to determine if the Nimitz-class carrier lives could be extended to as long as 55 years.

== See also ==
- Aircraft Carrier (Medium)
- List of aircraft carrier classes of the United States Navy
- List of aircraft carriers of the United States Navy
- List of aircraft carriers
- List of naval ship classes in service
- Modern US Navy carrier air operations
- Naval aviation
- Robert McNamara as Secretary of Defense § Naval aviation
- Timeline of aircraft carriers of the United States Navy
