= AN/SPN-46 =

US Navy X-band automatic carrier landing system radar

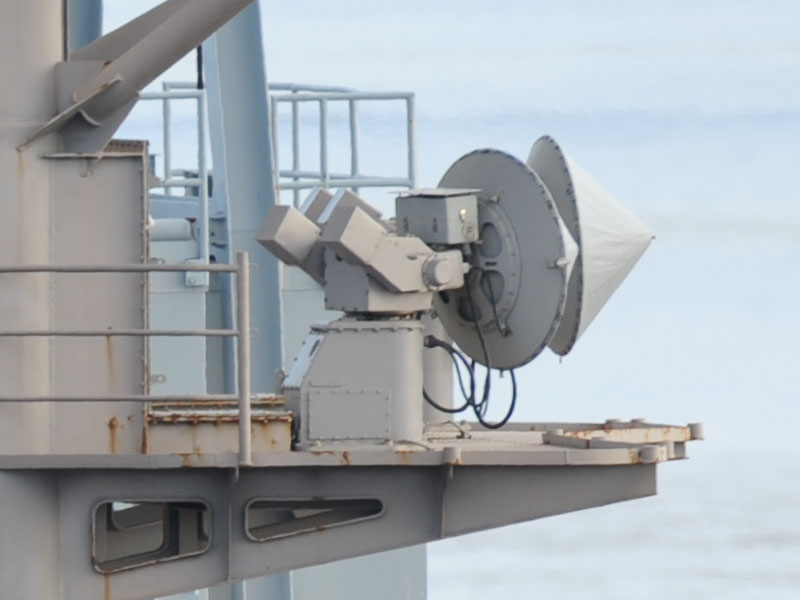
- A SPN-46(V)1 Radar system on the aircraft carrier USS Ronald Reagan
- Country of origin: United States
- Introduced: 1987
- No. built: 12
- Type: Precision Approach Landing System
- PRF: 2,000 pps
- Pulsewidth: 0.2 microsec
- Range: 10 nmi (19 km; 12 mi)
- Diameter: 4 ft (1.2 m)
- Azimuth: 25º
- Elevation: 1º
- Precision: 2 ft (0.61 m)
- Power: 50 kW peak
- Other names: AN/SPN-46(V)1; AN/SPN-46(V)2; AN/SPN-46(V)3

The AN/SPN-46 Automatic Carrier Landing System (ACLS) is an Ka-band and X-band monopulse doppler Precision Approach Landing System (PALS). Developed by Bell Textron, it is manufactured in the United States by Textron Systems. The radar uses two dual-band radar antennas to guide fixed-wing aircraft or helicopters to landing in all-weather conditions with no limitations due to low ceiling or restricted visibility.

== Variants ==
In accordance with the Joint Electronics Type Designation System (JETDS), the "AN/SPN-46" designation represents the 46th design of an Army-Navy electronic device for surface ship radar navigational aid system. The "(V)" designation represents that variable components are used in the system. After the (V), the numbers 1, 2, and 3 represent the 1st through 3rd specific configurations of the system as a whole.

The AN/SPN-46(V)1 version of the system is deployed specifically on aircraft carriers of the United States Navy. The (V)1 version uses six AN/AYK-14 Navy standard airborne computers for processing, and employs a MK-16 Mod 12 ring laser gyroscope shipboard stabilization unit. Its dual antennas are both 4 feet (1.2 m) long. The (V)1 system has 26 components grouped into four categories; display units (units 1 and 2), ancillary equipment (units 3 through 11), central computer (units 12 through 16) and radar/ship motion sensor (SMS) (units 17 through 26). The (V)1 version was specifically developed to replace the AN/SPN-42A on CV/CVN-class aircraft carriers.

The AN/SPN-46(V)2 is a ground-based Precision Approach Landing System (PALS) used to train pilots, operators and maintenance personnel. As opposed to the (V)1, the (V)2 system's dual antennas are both 7 feet (2.1 m) long. The (V)2 replaced the AN/SPN-42(T)1, AN/SPN-42(T)3, and AN/SPN-42(T)4 training radar systems at various Naval air stations.

The AN/SPN-46(V)3 was an upgrade to the (V)1 system improving operability and reliability. As of December 2021, according to the Navy, the (V)3 was expected to remain in service on ships providing for legacy aircraft.

All versions function very similar to each other. The only major differences between them are the (V)2 does not possess a MK-16 Mod 12 shipboard stabilization unit, and its antennas are 7 feet (2.1 m) long, as opposed to the 4 feet (1.2 m) antennas of the V(1). The larger antenna provides better low angle radar tracking on long runways.

== History ==
Bell Aerospace, of Buffalo, New York, a subsidiary of Textron at the time, was awarded a contract in 1980 to develop the AN/SPN-46 Automatic Carrier Landing System. The system was first tested in 1984, by the Patuxent River division of the Naval Air Warfare Center Aircraft Division (NAWCAD), in Maryland. In 1985 an AN/SPN-46(V)1 system was placed on the aircraft carrier USS John F. Kennedy (CV-67) for testing. In November of the same year, the US Navy awarded a US$16 million (worth about US$47,700,000 in 2025) contract for a limited production of three systems.

In 1986 and 1987, OPEVAL testing was conducted for the radar system. In 1987 the US Navy approved the system for "full automatic control from aircraft acquisition at ten nautical miles to touchdown on the deck".

Over a period of time between 1987 and 1991, five systems were delivered to the Navy. While the sixth was still being built, its builders, Bell Aircraft, a subsidiary of Textron Systems, merged with Textron Defense Systems, another subsidiary of Textron Systems. The (V)1 system was phased out of production in 1998, but was planned to remain in service until 2025. On April 10, 2021, Naval News reported BAE Systems was awarded a 5-year contract providing sustainment, integration and engineering services for the AN/SPN-46 which would mean support until about 2026.

== Specifications ==
The AN/SPN-46(V) provides three modes of operation based on type of control (manual or automatic) and source of information (display or voice).

Mode I provides automatic control using the central computer to process flight parameters from the radar, wind speed and direction equipment and other equipment. Once that information is processed, the system transmits command signals to each aircraft which translates the signals into control actions on the aircraft.
Mode II is used for manual control using a cockpit display as the source of information. This allows the pilot to make manual course corrections for landing.
Mode III is manual control using voice commands from a traffic controller monitoring the system. The controller provides the pilot voice communications for manual landing approach.

== See also ==
- AN/SPN-35 – Naval warship Precision Approach Radar landing system
- Joint Electronics Type Designation System – Unclassified designation system for United States military electronic equipment
- List of radars
- List of military electronics of the United States
