= Fireboats of Seattle =

Vehicle fleet of the Seattle Fire Department

As a major port, the Seattle Fire Department has maintained a fleet of fireboats in Seattle for over a century.

Fireboats in Seattle, Washington
image	name	launched	retired	notes
	Snoqualmie	1891	1935	First fireboat on North America's west coast.
	Duwamish	1909	1985	Duwamish was originally built with a "ram" bow, so she could sink a blazing vessel before it set other vessels ablaze.; Currently a museum ship.
	Alki	1927	2013	
	Chief Seattle	1984	in service	
	Marine One	2006	in service	
	Leschi	2007	in service	
