= Alki =

Alki (ælkaɪ) is a Chinook Jargon word meaning by and by and is the unofficial state motto of Washington.

It may also refer to:

- Alki Point, Seattle, a geographic feature
  - Alki Point Light, a lighthouse an Alki Point
  - Alki Beach Park, a park at Alki Point
- Alki Larnaca FC, a Cypriot football team that played from 1948 to 2014
- Alki Oroklini, a Cypriot football club based in Larnaca
- Alki David (born c. 1967–1968), a Greek businessman
- Alki Zei (born 1925), a Greek novelist
- Alki (boat), a fireboat in Seattle
