= List of aircraft carriers of the United States Navy =

Ships of the United States Navy

Ships in current service
- Current ships

Ships grouped alphabetically
- A–B; C; D–F; G–H; I–K; L; M; N–O; P; Q–R; S; T–V; W–Z

Ships grouped by type
- Aircraft carriers; Airships; Amphibious warfare ships; Auxiliaries; Battlecruisers; Battleships; Cruisers; Destroyers; Destroyer escorts; Destroyer leaders; Escort carriers; Frigates; Hospital ships; Littoral combat ships; Mine warfare vessels; Monitors; Oilers; Patrol vessels; Registered civilian vessels; Sailing frigates; Steam frigates; Steam gunboats; Ships of the line; Sloops of war; Submarines; Torpedo boats; Torpedo retrievers; Unclassified miscellaneous; Yard and district craft

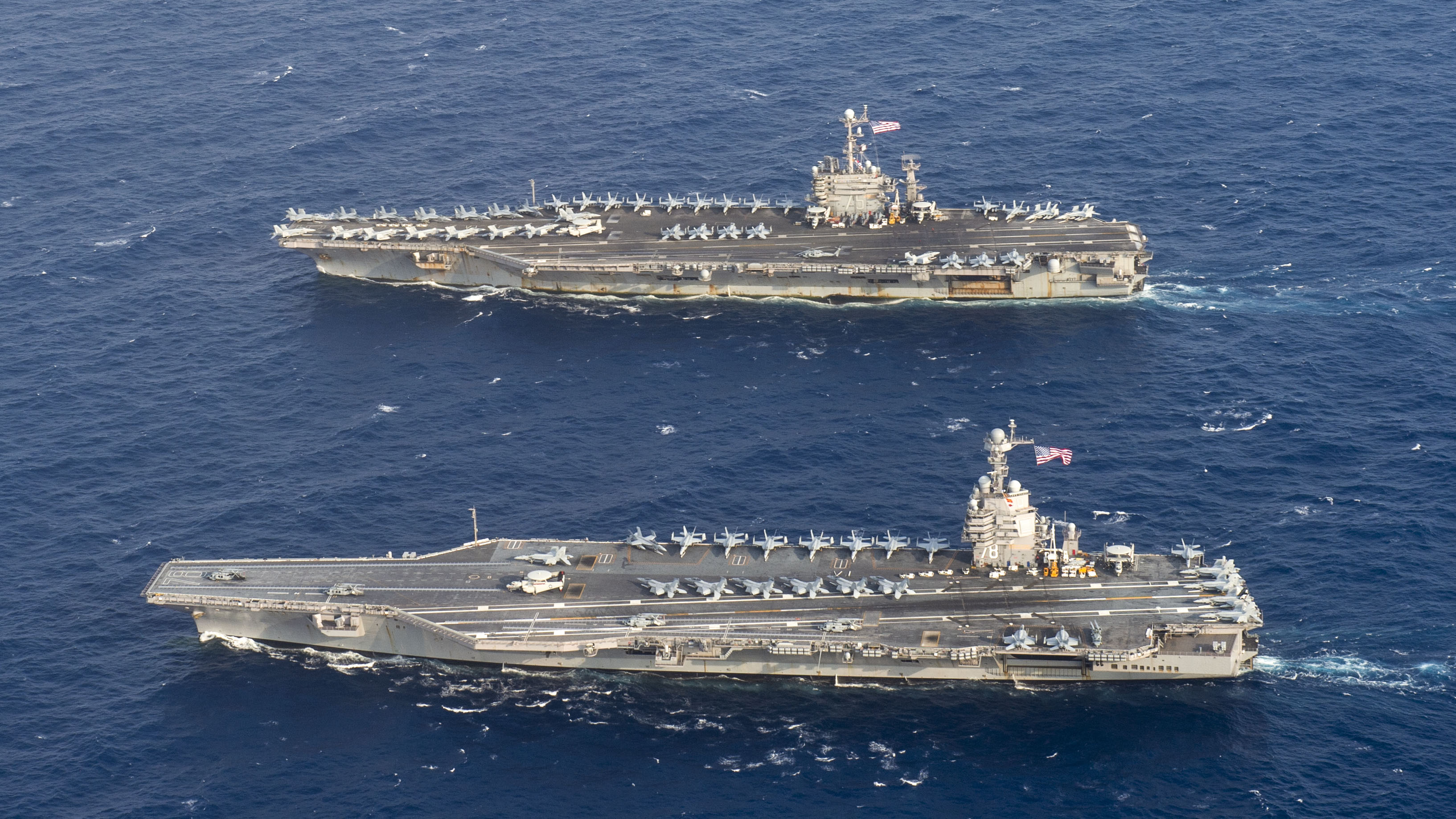
USS Gerald R. Ford (CVN-78) (foreground) alongside USS Harry S. Truman (CVN-75) in 2020

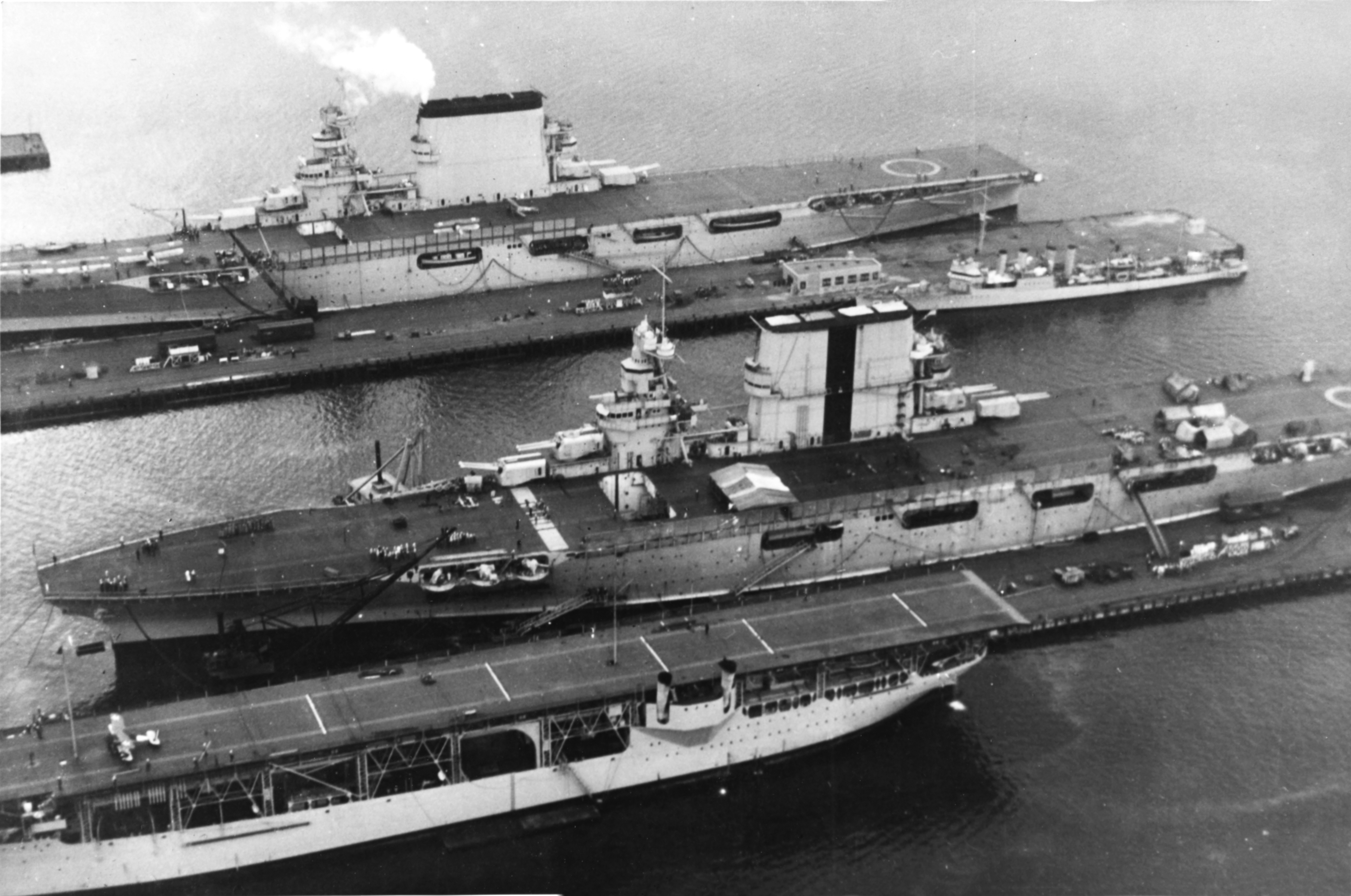
USS Langley (CV-1) (foreground), USS Saratoga (CV-3) (middle) and USS Lexington (CV-2) (background) in 1930

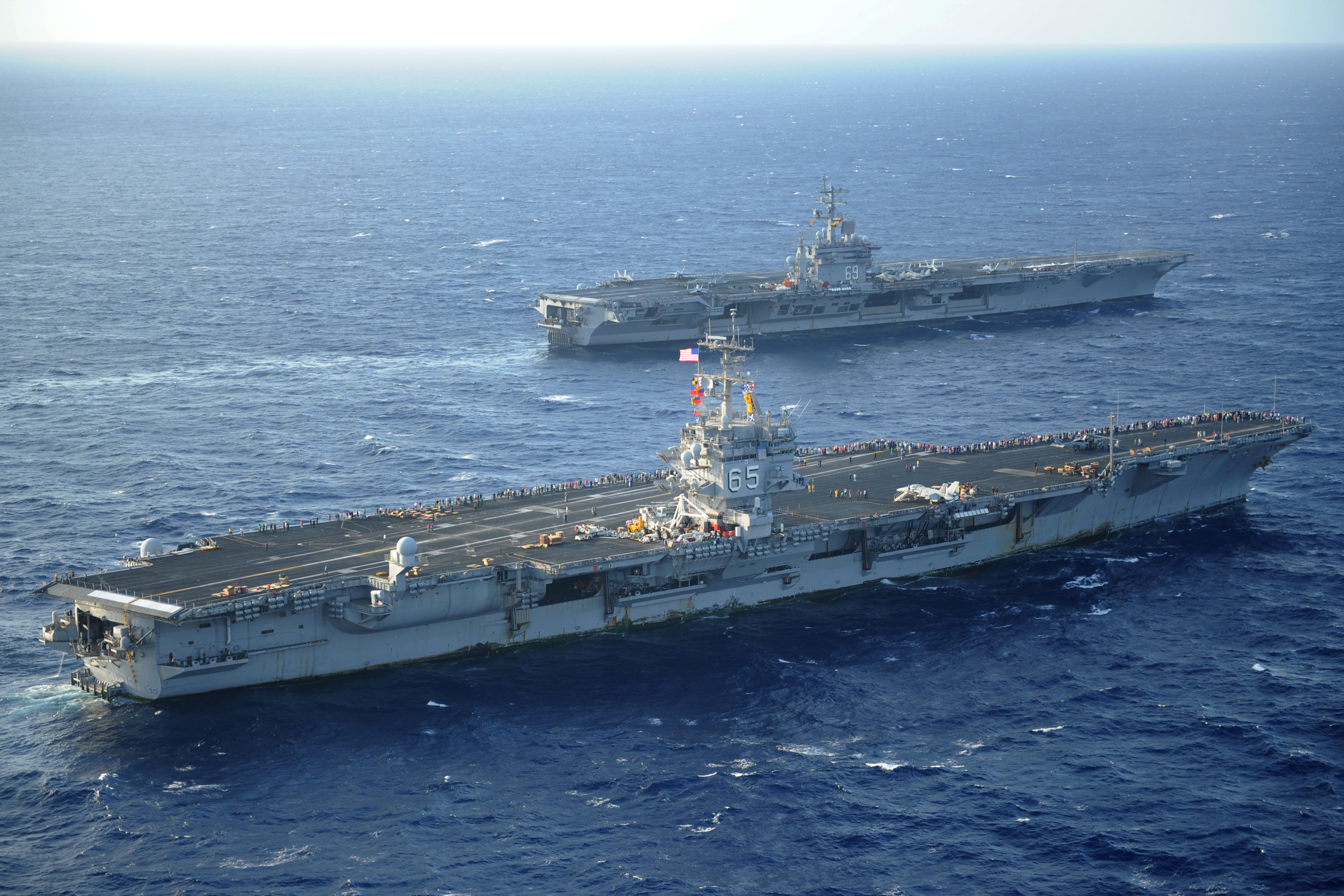
USS Enterprise (CVN-65) (foreground) and USS Dwight D. Eisenhower (CVN-69) in 2011

Aircraft carriers are warships that act as airbases for shipborne aircraft. United States Navy carriers are designated with hull classification symbols such as CV (Aircraft Carrier), CVA (Attack Aircraft Carrier), CVB (Large Aircraft Carrier), CVL (Light Aircraft Carrier), CVE (Escort Aircraft Carrier), CVS (Antisubmarine Aircraft Carrier) and CVN (Aircraft Carrier (Nuclear Propulsion)). Beginning with the Forrestal class (CV-59 to present), all carriers commissioned into service are classified as supercarriers.

The U.S. Navy has also used escort aircraft carriers (CVE, previously AVG and ACV) and airship aircraft carriers (ZRS). In addition, various amphibious warfare ships (LHA, LHD, LPH, and to a lesser degree LPD and LSD classes) can operate as carriers; two of these were converted to mine countermeasures support ships (MCS), one of which carried minesweeping helicopters. All of these classes of ships have their own lists and so are not included here.

== Historical overview ==
The first aircraft carrier commissioned into the U.S. Navy was USS Langley (CV-1) on 20 March 1922. The Langley was a converted Proteus-class collier, originally commissioned as USS Jupiter (AC-3). It was soon followed by the other pre-World War II classes: the Lexington class; USS Ranger, the first U.S. purpose-built carrier; theYorktown class, and USS Wasp.

As World War II loomed, two more classes of carriers were commissioned under President Franklin Roosevelt: the Essex class, which is informally divided into regular bow and extended bow sub-classes, and the Independence-class ships, which are classified as light aircraft carriers. Between these two classes, 35 ships were completed. The Navy also purchased two training vessels, USS Wolverine and USS Sable, which were given the unclassified miscellaneous (IX) hull designation.

The Midway class and the Saipan class were built later in World War II, but entered service too late to serve in the war. The Midway class would serve during the entire Cold War.

At the start of the Cold War, the first supercarriers, the United States class, were canceled due to the Truman administration's policy of shrinking the United States Navy and in particular, the Navy's air assets. The policy was revised after a public outcry and Congressional hearings sparked by the Revolt of the Admirals.

Later in the Cold War, supercarrier construction began with the Forrestal class, followed by the Kitty Hawk class; Enterprise (CVN-65), the first nuclear-powered carrier; and John F. Kennedy (CV-67), the last conventionally powered carrier. These were followed by the Nimitz class and the modern-day post-cold war Gerald R. Ford-class nuclear supercarriers, the only two classes of supercarriers that are currently in active-duty service. With the ten-ship Nimitz class complete by 2009, October 2013 saw the launch of Gerald R. Ford, lead ship of the planned ten-ship Gerald R. Ford class. This was followed by the launch of John F. Kennedy (CVN-79) in October 2019, while construction is underway on Enterprise (CVN-80) and Doris Miller (CVN-81).

== List ==
Keys

- out of service
- in active service
- cancelled before completion
- under construction
- on order

Hull no.	Name	Image	Class	Commissioned	Decommissioned	Service life	Status	Ref.
CV-1	Langley		Langley (lead ship)	20 March 1922	27 February 1942	19 years, 344 days	Converted to a seaplane tender in 1936, Sunk near Cilacap, Java in 1942	
CV-2	Lexington		Lexington (lead ship)	14 December 1927	8 May 1942	14 years, 145 days	Sunk in the Battle of the Coral Sea in 1942	
CV-3	Saratoga		Lexington	16 November 1927	25 July 1946	18 years, 253 days	Sunk as target ship near Bikini Atoll during Operation Crossroads in 1946	
CV-4	Ranger		Ranger (lead ship)	4 June 1934	18 October 1946	12 years, 136 days	Scrapped in 1947	
CV-5	Yorktown		Yorktown (lead ship)	30 September 1937	7 June 1942	4 years, 250 days	Sunk in the Battle of Midway in 1942	
CV-6	Enterprise		Yorktown	12 May 1938	17 February 1947	8 years, 281 days	Scrapped in 1960	
CV-7	Wasp		Wasp (lead ship)	25 April 1940	15 September 1942	2 years, 143 days	Sunk during the Guadalcanal campaign in 1942	
CV-8	Hornet		Yorktown	20 October 1941	27 October 1942	1 year, 7 days	Sunk in the Battle of the Santa Cruz Islands in 1942	
CV-9	Essex		Essex (lead ship)	31 December 1942	30 June 1969	26 years, 171 days	Scrapped in 1975	
CV-10	Yorktown		Essex	15 April 1943	27 June 1970	27 years, 73 days	Preserved at the Patriot's Point Naval & Maritime Museum—Mount Pleasant, South Carolina, US	
CV-11	Intrepid		Essex	16 August 1943	15 March 1974	30 years, 211 days	Preserved at the Intrepid Sea-Air-Space Museum—New York City, US	
CV-12	Hornet		Essex	29 November 1943	26 June 1970	26 years, 218 days	Preserved at USS Hornet Museum—Alameda, California, US	
CV-13	Franklin		Essex	31 January 1944	17 February 1947	2 years, 351 days	Scrapped in 1966	
CV-14	Ticonderoga		Essex (extended bow)	8 May 1944	1 September 1973	29 years, 116 days	Scrapped in 1975	
CV-15	Randolph		Essex (extended bow)	9 October 1944	13 February 1969	24 years, 127 days	Scrapped in 1975	
CV-16	Lexington		Essex	17 February 1943	8 November 1991	48 years, 264 days	Preserved at USS Lexington Museum on the Bay— Corpus Christi, Texas, US	
CV-17	Bunker Hill		Essex	25 May 1943	9 January 1947	3 years, 229 days	Scrapped in 1973	
CV-18	Wasp		Essex	24 November 1943	1 July 1972	28 years, 220 days	Scrapped in 1973	
CV-19	Hancock		Essex (extended bow)	15 April 1944	30 January 1976	31 years, 290 days	Scrapped in 1976	
CV-20	Bennington		Essex	6 August 1944	15 January 1970	25 years, 162 days	Scrapped in 1994	
CV-21	Boxer		Essex (extended bow)	16 April 1945	1 December 1969	24 years, 229 days	Scrapped in 1971	
CVL-22	Independence		Independence (lead ship)	14 January 1943	28 August 1946	3 years, 226 days	Sunk as target ship near the Farallon Islands in 1951	
CVL-23	Princeton		Independence	25 February 1943	24 October 1944	1 year, 242 days	Sunk in the Battle of Leyte Gulf in 1944	
CVL-24	Belleau Wood		Independence	31 March 1943	13 January 1947	3 years, 288 days	Scrapped in 1960	
CVL-25	Cowpens		Independence	28 May 1943	13 January 1947	3 years, 230 days	Scrapped in 1960	
CVL-26	Monterey		Independence	17 June 1943	16 January 1956	12 years, 213 days	Scrapped in 1971	
CVL-27	Langley		Independence	31 August 1943	11 February 1947	3 years, 164 days	Scrapped in 1964	
CVL-28	Cabot		Independence	24 July 1943	21 January 1955	11 years, 181 days	Scrapped in 2002	
CVL-29	Bataan		Independence	17 November 1943	9 April 1954	10 years, 143 days	Scrapped in 1961	
CVL-30	San Jacinto		Independence	15 November 1943	1 March 1947	3 years, 106 days	Scrapped in 1972	
CV-31	Bon Homme Richard		Essex	26 November 1944	2 July 1971	26 years, 218 days	Scrapped in 1992	
CV-32	Leyte		Essex (extended bow)	11 April 1946	15 May 1959	13 years, 34 days	Scrapped in 1970	
CV-33	Kearsarge		Essex (extended bow)	2 March 1946	13 February 1970	23 years, 348 days	Scrapped in 1974	
CV-34	Oriskany		Essex (extended bow)	25 September 1950	20 September 1976	28 years, 360 days	Scuttled as artificial reef in the Gulf of Mexico in 2006	
CV-35	Reprisal		Essex (extended bow)	—N/a	—N/a	—N/a	Cancelled during construction. Scrapped in 1949	
CV-36	Antietam		Essex (extended bow)	28 January 1945	8 May 1963	18 years, 100 days	Scrapped in 1974	
CV-37	Princeton		Essex (extended bow)	18 November 1945	30 January 1970	24 years, 73 days	Scrapped in 1971	
CV-38	Shangri-La		Essex (extended bow)	15 September 1944	30 July 1971	26 years, 318 days	Scrapped in 1988	
CV-39	Lake Champlain		Essex (extended bow)	3 June 1945	2 May 1966	20 years, 333 days	Scrapped in 1972	
CV-40	Tarawa		Essex (extended bow)	8 December 1945	13 May 1960	14 years, 157 days	Scrapped in 1968	
CVB-41	Midway		Midway (lead ship)	10 September 1945	11 April 1992	46 years, 214 days	Preserved at the USS Midway Museum—San Diego, California, US	
CVB-42	Franklin D. Roosevelt		Midway	27 October 1945	1 October 1977	31 years, 339 days	Scrapped in 1978	
CVB-43	Coral Sea		Midway	1 October 1947	26 April 1990	42 years, 207 days	Scrapped in 2000	
CV-44	—		Midway	—N/a	—N/a	—N/a	Cancelled before construction began.	
CV-45	Valley Forge		Essex (extended bow)	3 November 1946	15 January 1970	23 years, 73 days	Scrapped in 1971	
CV-46	Iwo Jima		Essex (extended bow)	—N/a	—N/a	—N/a	Cancelled during construction. Scrapped in 1949	
CV-47	Philippine Sea		Essex (extended bow)	11 May 1946	28 December 1958	12 years, 231 days	Scrapped in 1971	
CVL-48	Saipan		Saipan (lead ship)	14 July 1946	14 January 1970	23 years, 184 days	Scrapped in 1976	
CVL-49	Wright		Saipan	9 February 1947	27 May 1970	23 years, 107 days	Scrapped in 1980	
CV-50 – CV-55	—		Essex	These hulls were all cancelled before construction began.				
CVB-56, CVB-57	—		Midway	These hulls were all cancelled before construction began.				
CVA-58	United States		United States (lead ship)	—N/a	—N/a	—N/a	Cancelled during construction. Scrapped on slip in 1949	
CV-59	Forrestal		Forrestal (lead ship)	1 October 1955	11 September 1993	37 years, 345 days	Scrapped in 2015	
CV-60	Saratoga		Forrestal	14 April 1956	20 August 1994	38 years, 128 days	Scrapped in 2019	
CV-61	Ranger		Forrestal	10 August 1957	10 July 1993	35 years, 334 days	Scrapped in 2017	
CV-62	Independence		Forrestal	10 January 1959	30 September 1998	39 years, 263 days	Scrapped in 2019	
CV-63	Kitty Hawk		Kitty Hawk (lead ship)	29 April 1961	12 May 2009	48 years, 13 days	Scrapped in 2024	
CV-64	Constellation		Kitty Hawk	27 October 1961	7 August 2003	41 years, 284 days	Scrapped in 2017	
CVN-65	Enterprise		Enterprise (lead ship)	25 November 1961	3 February 2017	55 years, 70 days	Struck, to be scrapped	
CV-66	America		Kitty Hawk	23 January 1965	9 August 1996	31 years, 199 days	Sunk as target ship in the Atlantic Ocean in 2005	
CV-67	John F. Kennedy		John F. Kennedy (lead ship)	7 September 1968	23 March 2007	38 years, 197 days	Undergoing scrapping	
CVN-68	Nimitz		Nimitz (lead ship)	3 May 1975	—	51 years, 188 days	Stationed at Naval Base Kitsap, Bremerton, Washington	
CVN-69	Dwight D. Eisenhower		Nimitz	18 October 1977	—	49 years, 20 days	Stationed at Naval Station Norfolk, Norfolk, Virginia	
CVN-70	Carl Vinson		Nimitz	13 March 1982	—	44 years, 239 days	Stationed at Naval Air Station North Island, San Diego, California	
CVN-71	Theodore Roosevelt		Nimitz	25 October 1986	—	40 years, 13 days	Stationed at Naval Air Station North Island, San Diego, California	
CVN-72	Abraham Lincoln		Nimitz	11 November 1989	—	36 years, 361 days	Stationed at Naval Air Station North Island, San Diego, California	
CVN-73	George Washington		Nimitz	4 July 1992	—	34 years, 126 days	Stationed at Fleet Activities Yokosuka, Yokosuka, Japan	
CVN-74	John C. Stennis		Nimitz	9 December 1995	—	30 years, 333 days	Stationed at Naval Station Norfolk, Norfolk, Virginia (Undergoing Maintenance)	
CVN-75	Harry S. Truman		Nimitz	25 July 1998	—	28 years, 105 days	Stationed at Naval Station Norfolk, Norfolk, Virginia	
CVN-76	Ronald Reagan		Nimitz	12 July 2003	—	23 years, 118 days	Stationed at Naval Base Kitsap, Bremerton, Washington	
CVN-77	George H.W. Bush		Nimitz	10 January 2009	—	17 years, 301 days	Stationed at Naval Station Norfolk, Norfolk, Virginia	
CVN-78	Gerald R. Ford		Gerald R. Ford (lead ship)	22 July 2017	—	9 years, 108 days	Stationed at Naval Station Norfolk, Norfolk, Virginia	
CVN-79	John F. Kennedy		Gerald R. Ford	c. 2027	—	—	Sea trials	
CVN-80	Enterprise		Gerald R. Ford	c. 2030	—	—	Under construction	
CVN-81	Doris Miller		Gerald R. Ford	c. 2034	—	—	Ordered	
CVN-82	William J. Clinton		Gerald R. Ford	c. 2034	—	—	Ordered	
CVN-83	George W. Bush		Gerald R. Ford	c. 2036	—	—	Ordered	

== Training ships ==
During World War II, the United States Navy purchased 2 Great Lakes side-wheel paddle steamers and converted them into freshwater aircraft carrier training ships. Both vessels were designated with the hull classification symbol IX and lacked hangar decks, elevators or armaments. The role of these ships was for the training of pilots for carrier take-offs and landings in a safe area where the carriers would not be at risk of attack by hostile forces. Together the Sable and Wolverine trained 17,820 pilots in 116,000 carrier landings. Of these, 51,000 landings were on Sable.

Billed as the "world's smallest aircraft carrier" from 1986 to 2011, the Baylander (IX-514) had conducted 120,000 helicopter training landings.

#	Name	Image	Class	Commissioned	Decommissioned	Service life	Status	Ref.
IX-64	Wolverine		n/a (converted side-wheel steamer)	12 August 1942	7 November 1945	3 years, 2 months and 26 days	Scrapped in 1947 in Milwaukee, Wisconsin, United States	
IX-81	Sable		n/a (converted side-wheel steamer)	8 May 1943	7 November 1945	2 years, 5 months and 30 days	Scrapped in 1948 in Hamilton, Ontario, Canada	
IX-514	Baylander		n/a (converted harbor utility craft YFU-79)	31 March 1986	15 December 2011	25 years, 8 months and 15 days	As of July 2020, the Baylander serves as a restaurant and bar in New York City.	

== Aircraft carrier museums ==
- National Museum of the United States Navy – Aircraft carrier museums

== See also ==
- Escort carrier
- List of amphibious warfare ships
- List of aircraft carriers
- List of aircraft carriers by configuration
- List of aircraft carriers in service
- List of aircraft carriers of World War II
- List of current ships of the United States Navy
- List of escort carriers of the United States Navy
- List of ships of World War II
- List of sunken aircraft carriers
- List of United States Navy ships
- List of United States Navy losses in World War II § Aircraft carriers (CV/CVL) - abbreviated list
- List of U.S. Navy ships sunk or damaged in action during World War II § Aircraft carriers (CV) - detailed list
- Naval Inactive Ship Maintenance Facility
- Sea Control Ship
- Seaplane tender/seaplane carrier
- Timeline for aircraft carrier service
- Timeline of aircraft carriers of the United States Navy
