= Leschi (fireboat) =

Fireboat operated by the Seattle Fire Department

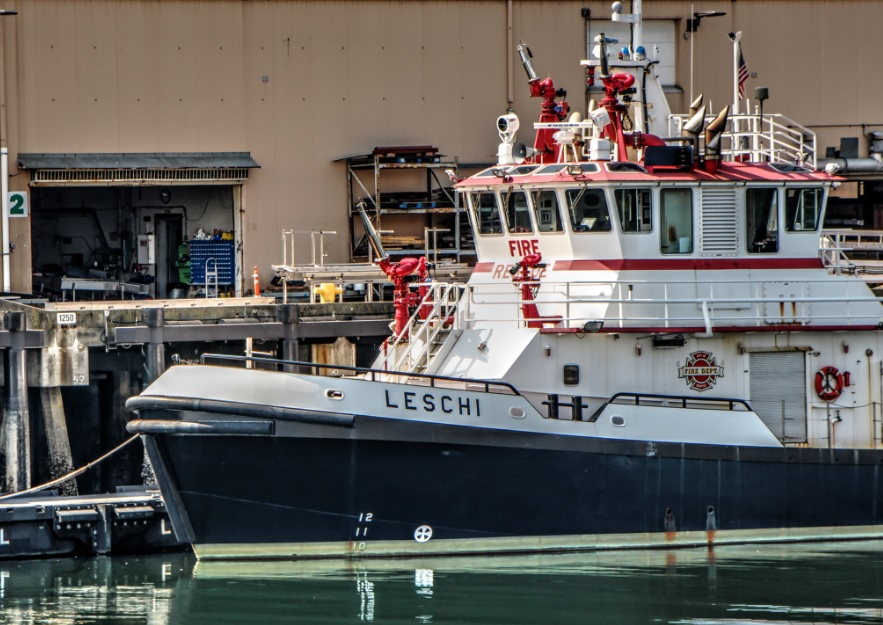
- Leschi

History

United States
- Name: Leschi
- Namesake: Chief Leschi
- Owner: City of Seattle
- Operator: Seattle Fire Department
- Port of registry: Seattle
- Ordered: 2004
- Builder: Dakota Creek Industries
- In service: 2007
- Identification: MMSI number: 367149030

General characteristics
- Type: Fireboat
- Displacement: 303 t (298 long tons; 334 short tons)
- Length: 108 ft (33 m)
- Beam: 26.4 ft (8.0 m)
- Draft: 10 ft (3.0 m)
- Speed: 14 knots (26 km/h; 16 mph)
- Boats & landing craft carried: 1
- Crew: 4

Leschi, named for the native American leader Chief Leschi, is a fireboat operated by the Seattle Fire Department. The ship was laid down in 2006 and commissioned in 2007; its sponsor was Sharon Nickels, wife of the then-mayor Greg Nickels.

The 108-foot (33 m) Leschi has been described as the "dreadnought of Seattle's fireboat fleet". Carrying a normal complement of four, its mission includes firefighting, search and rescue, and response to chemical, biological, radiological, nuclear, and explosive (CBRNE) emergencies. It can also be used as a mobile pump and fuel station and as emergency medical treatment and command center.

== History ==
=== Background ===
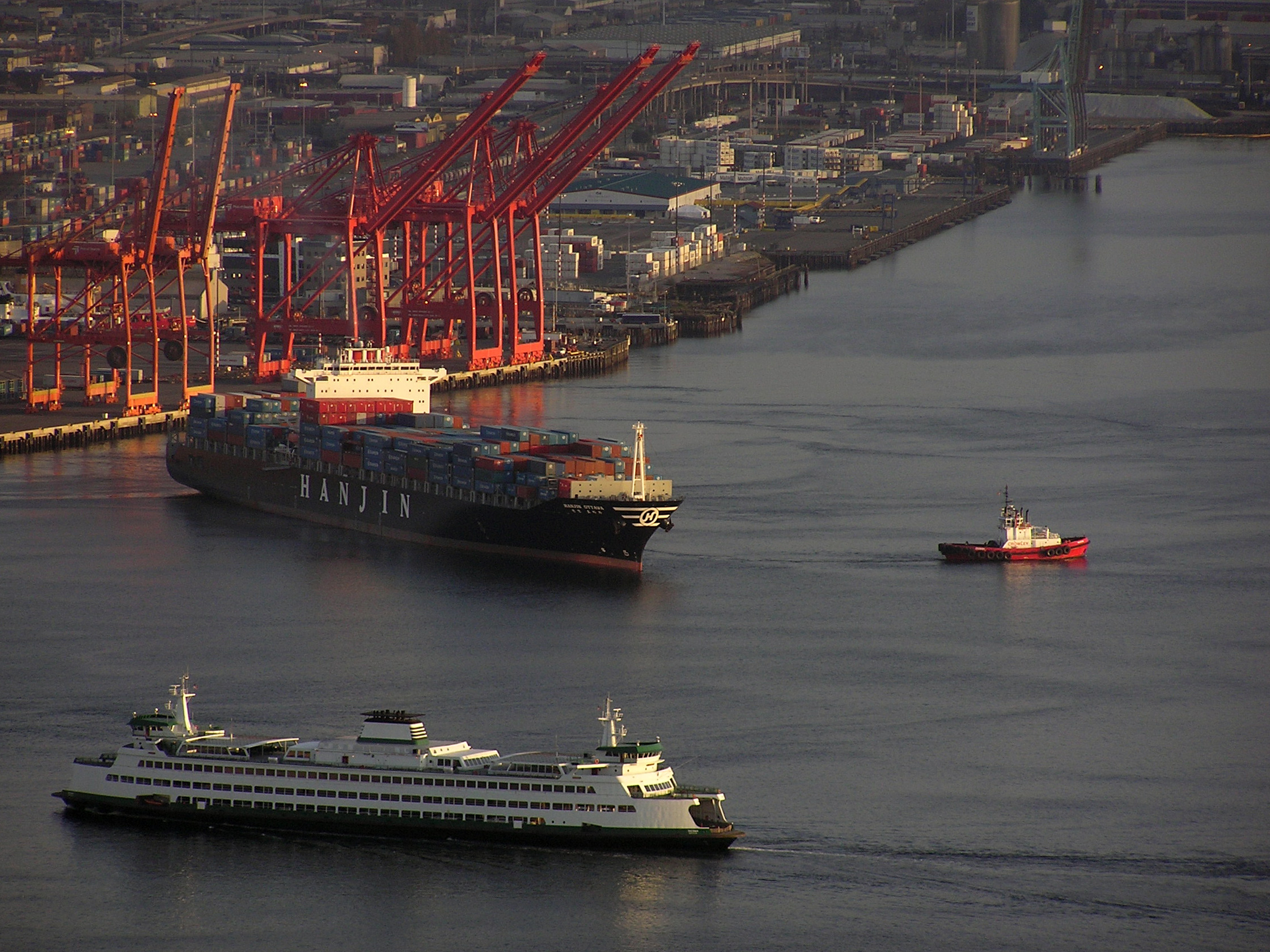
Maritime and waterfront fires have been a continual concern for Seattle, which is one of the largest ports on the U.S. west coast.

Seattle is one of the largest ports on the United States west coast and waterfront fires have been a continual concern for the city. Since 1891 the Seattle Fire Department has regularly operated at least two fireboats, which can be augmented by ships and small craft with fire suppression capabilities from the U.S. Coast Guard, Seattle Police, and neighboring municipalities. One of the worst maritime fires in the city's history occurred in 1968 when an electrical malfunction at Todd Shipyards sparked a fire that took 14 engine companies, two fireboats, two U.S. Coast Guard cutters, and several conscripted Foss Maritime tugboats more than half-a-day to extinguish.

In the 1970s the United States Maritime Administration funded a special program to train a contingent of 50 Seattle firefighters to provide land-based support in the control and extinguishing of dockside and shipboard conflagrations. The effort, which was studied by the Stanford Research Institute, later became a model for other waterfront cities.

=== Procurement ===
Prior to Leschi's construction, Seattle's flagship firefighting vessel was the aging Alki, which was built in 1927 and operated alongside a newer vessel, Chief Seattle. Once known as the world's third "most powerful fireboat," by the early 2000s the antique Alki had become increasingly difficult to operate. On one occasion, in 2003, an engine problem left the vessel dead in the water and the ship was only able to move by firing its legendarily powerful water cannons.

Procurement of a modern fireboat to replace Alki was part of a successful public safety levy enacted by Seattle voters in 2003 approving its construction. Leschi was built at a cost of $12 million by Dakota Creek Industries of Anacortes, Washington, from a design by Jensen Marine Consultants. The Seattle Fire Department took delivery of the vessel in 2007 during a commissioning ceremony attended by mayor Greg Nickels. The ship sponsor was Nickels' wife, Sharon. The name, Leschi, had been suggested by Kadi Camara, a Seattle elementary school student, as part of a naming competition held by the city. It was meant to honor a former Nisqually chief. Camara got to ride on the ship as a prize. Following the commissioning of Leschi, Alki was retired. Leschi is berthed on Elliott Bay where it is the primary response vehicle for maritime fires on the city's outer shoreline.

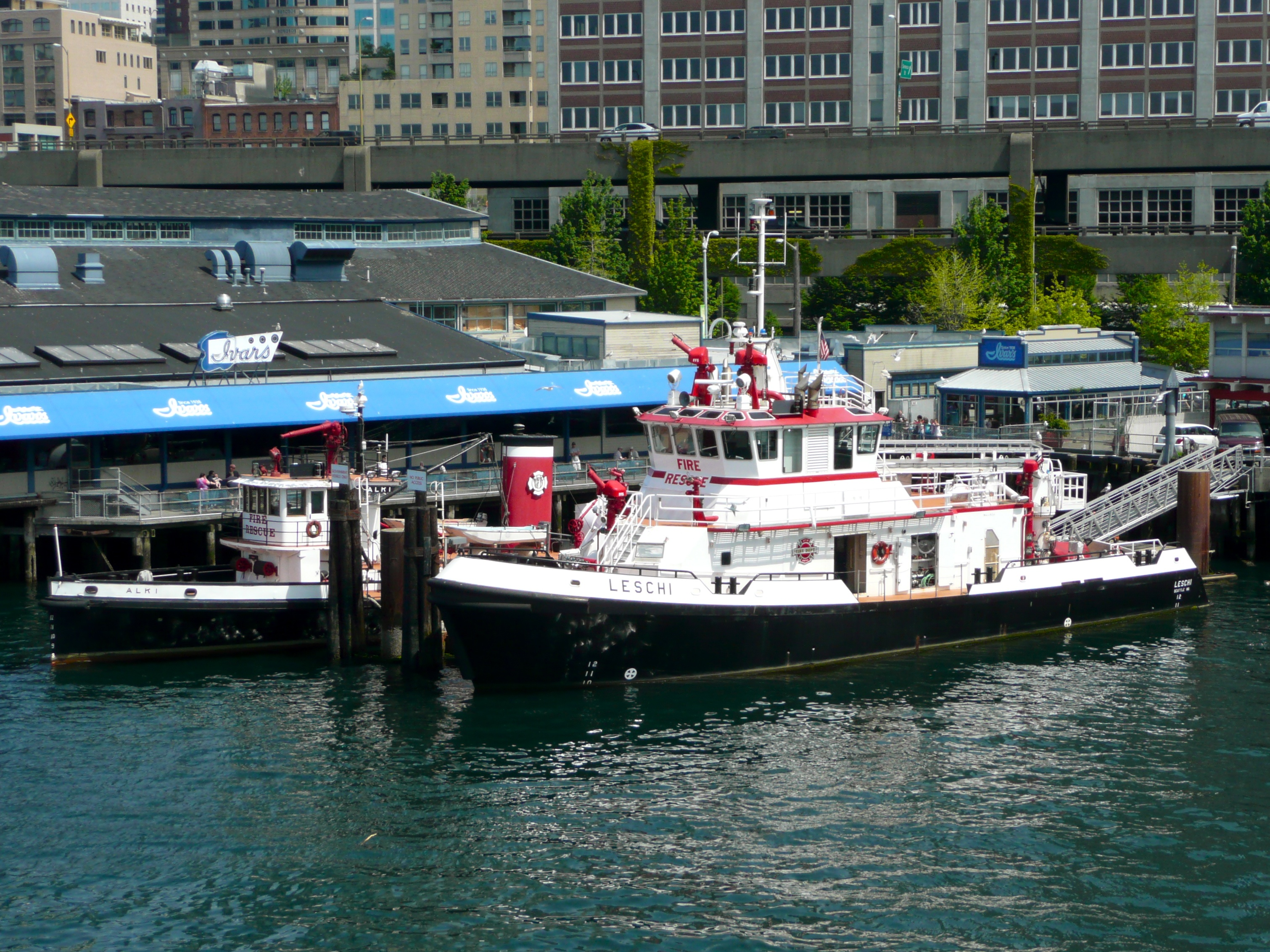
Leschi moored next to Alki in 2009

== Design and specifications ==
Described as the "dreadnought of Seattle's fireboat fleet," Leschi is one of three fireboats currently operated by the Seattle Fire Department (SFD), the others being Chief Seattle and Marine One. The 108-foot (33 m) Leschi is powered by twin diesel engines rated at 1,550 horsepower (1,160 kW), turning 72-inch (1,800 mm) four-blade propellers, which give the ship a flank speed of 14 knots (26 km/h; 16 mph). Two additional engines, rated at 1,440 horsepower (1,070 kW), power the ship's four water pumps. Unlike its predecessor, Alki, Leschi has touchscreen consoles for bridge command controls instead of manual "knobs and levers". By displacement and pump capacity, it is the largest of ten municipal-owned fireboats that support the U.S. Coast Guard's regional marine firefighting plan for Puget Sound.

== Mission and capabilities ==
According to Professional Mariner, Leschi's mission is "firefighting, mobile platform for emergency medical treatment and command center, mobile pump and fuel station, and response to chemical, biological, radiological, nuclear, and explosive (CBRNE) emergencies."

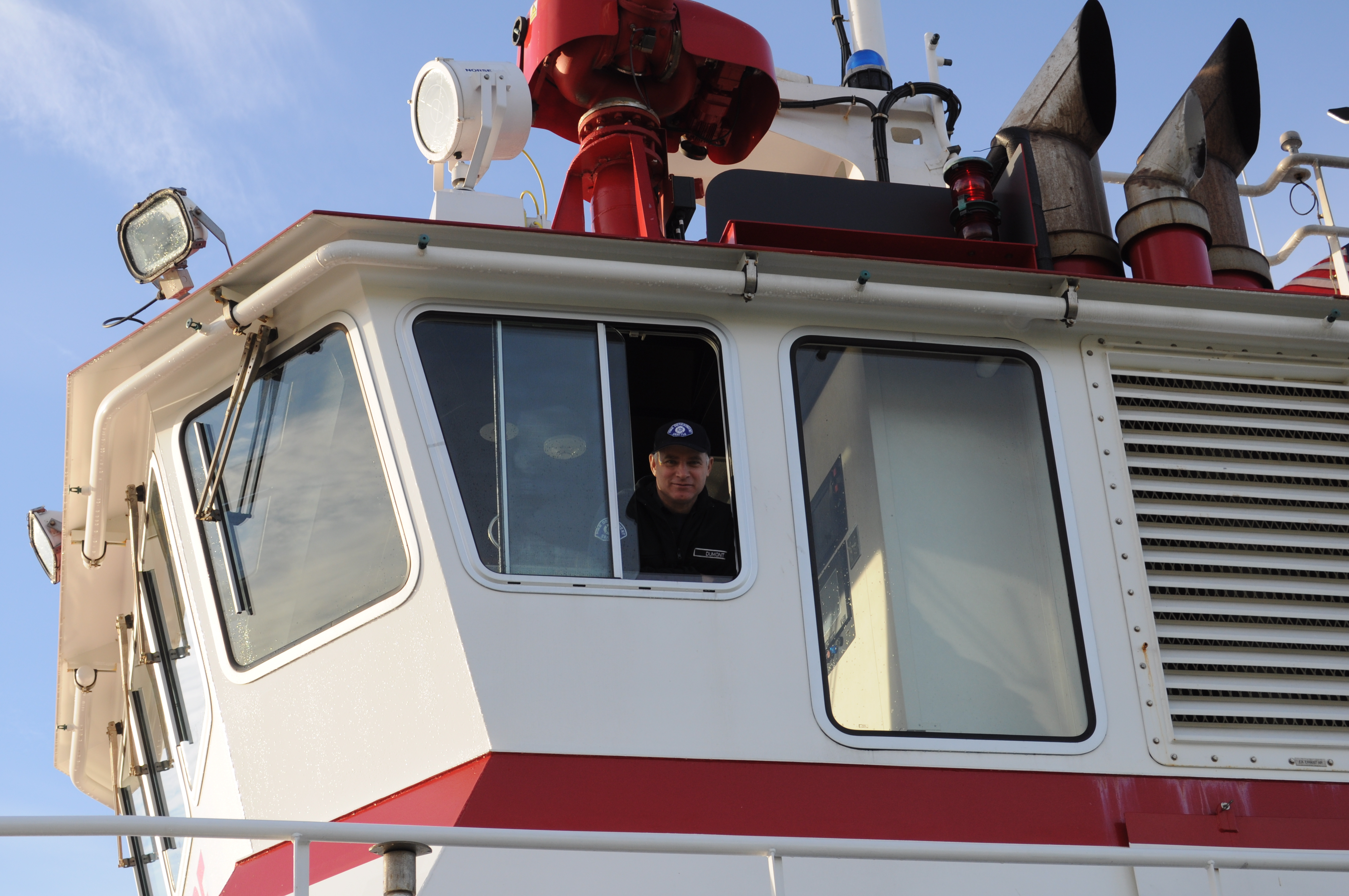
A Seattle firefighter looks out of a bridge portal on Leschi in 2009

The ship's principal fire suppression equipment comes in the form of four 5,000-US-gallon (19,000 L; 4,200 imp gal) per-minute water pumps. In addition to pumping water, the ship's firefighting apparatus can tap an integrated 6,000-US-gallon (23,000 L; 5,000 imp gal) foam tank for use against chemical-fueled fires. Leschi also has a 55-foot (17 m) telescoping crane with ladder and fire line for use against container ship fires and the ship is able to douse itself with a cooling fog to allow for operation directly adjacent to a major fire.

In addition to marine firefighting, Leschi can support land-based firefighters in the event of a disaster that destroys Seattle's water mains. Manifolds on Leschi's deck provide ports through which hose lines can be run to provide fire engines with direct access to seawater.

Leschi is designed to operate with a complement of four personnel, but has a command and communications room for use by senior SFD officers in the event of a catastrophe that renders land facilities unusable. The ship is outfitted with a CBRN defense system for crew protection in the event of a nuclear or chemical weapons attack against Seattle, or similar disaster. When activated, the system automatically seals pressurized hatches to the bridge and command center; uncontaminated air is provided by a fan and filter system.

The ship is regularly equipped with a rigid-hulled inflatable boat that can be launched from the ship's stern. A thermal imaging camera system allows the ship's crew to locate distressed persons in the water (such as in a man overboard emergency) at night or during other low-visibility conditions.
