= Marine One (fireboat) =

Fireboat

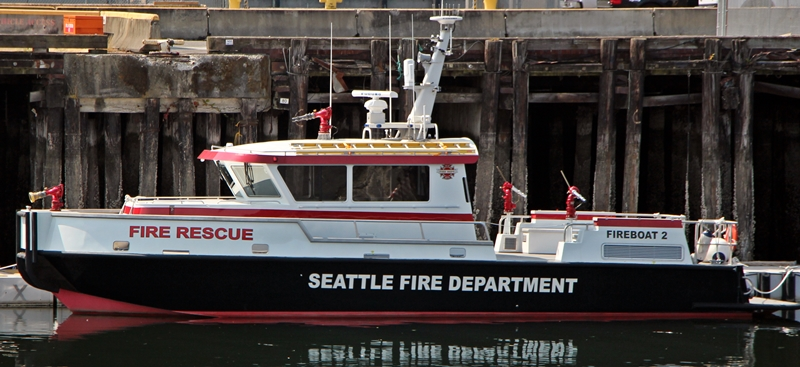
Seattle fireboat Fireboat 2

MV Marine One is a fireboat operated by the Seattle Fire Department (SFD). Marine One was laid down in 2006 and entered service the same year. It is one of three fireboats operated by the SFD, the others being MV Leschi and MV Chief Seattle. All of these vessels respond to salt and fresh water situations.

The 50-foot (15 m) vessel, classified by the SFD as a "fast attack boat", has a flank speed of about 30 knots (56 km/h; 35 mph). It is a FireStorm 50 model fireboat constructed by MetalCraft Marine of Kingston, Ontario. The craft has an integrated 200-US-gallon (760 L; 170 imp gal) foam tank for use against chemically-fueled fires. It can pump water for land-based firefighting, handle rescue and salvage operations in contaminated environments, accommodate emergency medical services and pinpoint people in the water and other hot spots through a thermal imaging camera.
