= PACECO Corp. =

Shipyard in Alameda, California, United States

Coordinates: 37.772343°N 122.239723°W

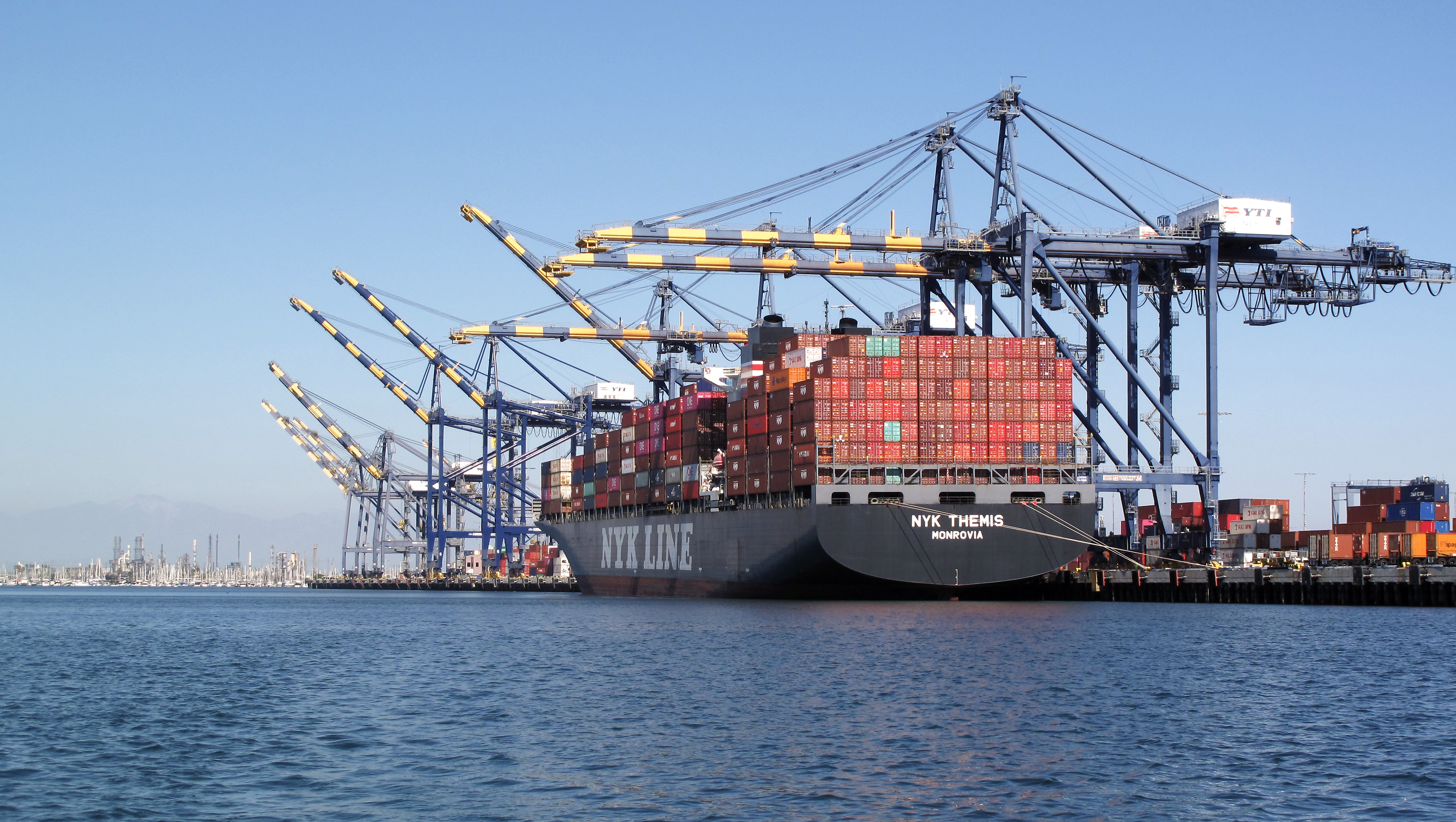
Paceco-Mitsui STS cranes at the Port of Los Angeles

PACECO Corp., formerly the Pacific Coast Engineering Company, is an American industrial fabricator and mechanical engineering company headquartered in Haywood, California. It is a wholly owned subsidiary of Mitsui E&S.

PACECO focuses on the production of container handling cranes, which are branded as PORTAINER and TRANSTAINER. On 22 February 2024, the White House announced that as part of its 20-billion-dollar scheme to upgrade and secure the country's port infrastructure, Mitsui E&S and PACECO are planning to resume manufacturing cranes in the US.

== History ==
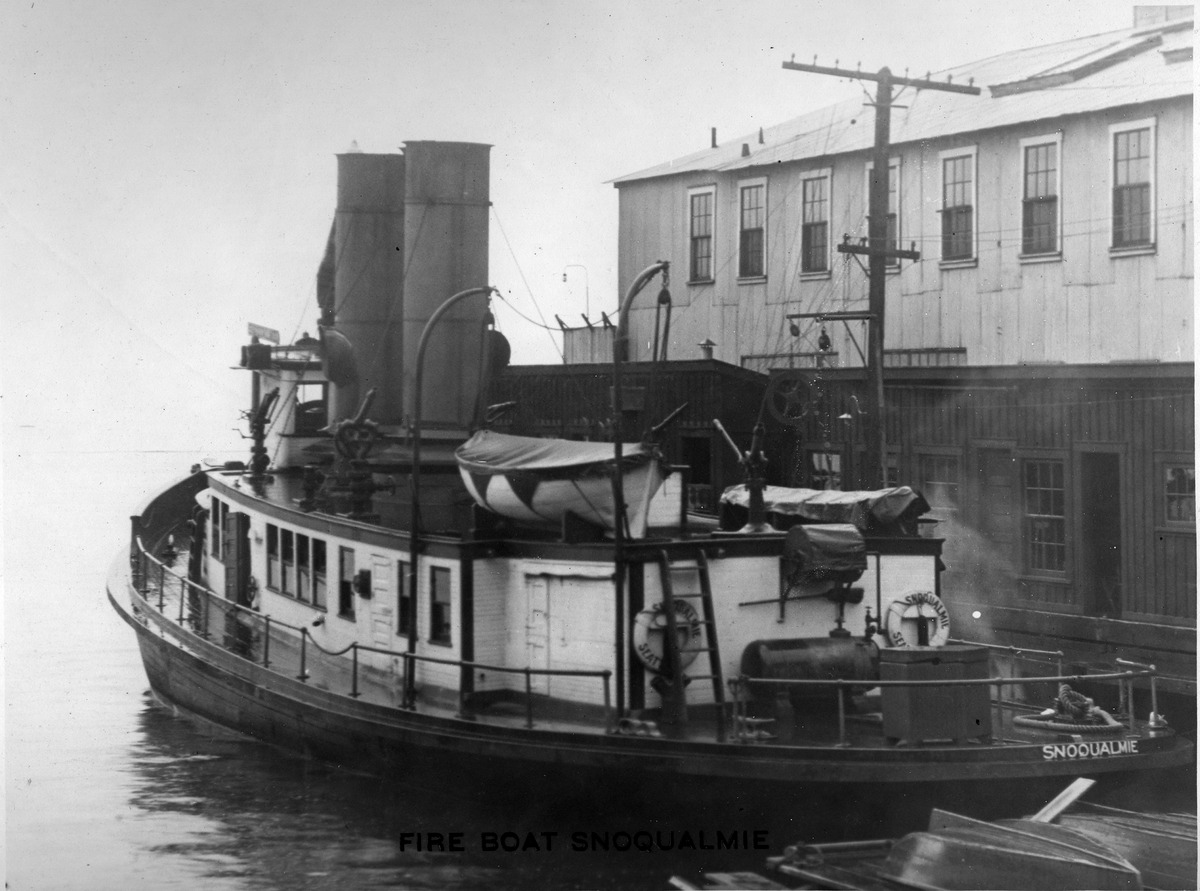
The Snoqualmie at her moorings in 1920

PACECO was previously a shipbuilding company in Oakland, California and then Alameda, California. To support the World War II demand for ships, PACECO shipyard switched over to military construction and built US Navy Tugboats.

As early as February 1920, PACECO was reported to be bidding on a contract to make alterations or improvements to a Japanese steamer in Seattle. Started as a mechanical engineering company, PACECO began operations in its Oakland shipyard in 1922. The Oakland shipyard at the 14th Street terminus (Oakland Outer Harbor) was acquired by the US. Navy in 1940 for World War II needs. PACECO moved the shipyard to 350 Blanding Avenue, Alameda. The new yard did prefab sub assemblies for the other Bay Area shipyards, like the Richmond Shipyards. In 1943, PACECO built its first of five US Navy tugboats.

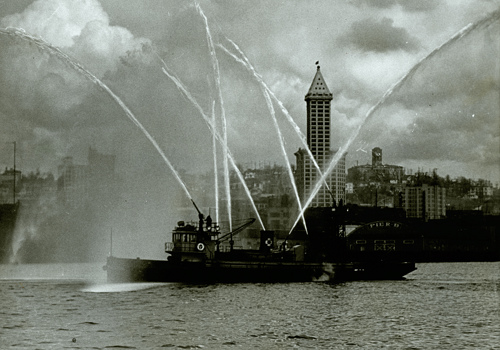
The Alki showing off in 1940

After the war, PACECO built tugboats, barges, and container cranes. The first quayside container gantry crane was developed by PACECO in 1959. PACECO was sold to Fruehauf Trailer Corporation in 1967. Fruehauf ended shipbuilding in 1976 and changed to build primarily container crane and container chassis. The Alameda shipyard was on the south side of the Tidal Canal, just west of the Park Street Bridge on the Oakland Estuary in the San Francisco Bay Area. Between 2010 and 2020, real-estate developers and the City of Alameda engaged in approval processes and lawsuits regarding the future of the site. The site is approved for redevelopment by Boatworks LLC, although as of 2026 no construction has begun.

== Ships ==
Notable ships:

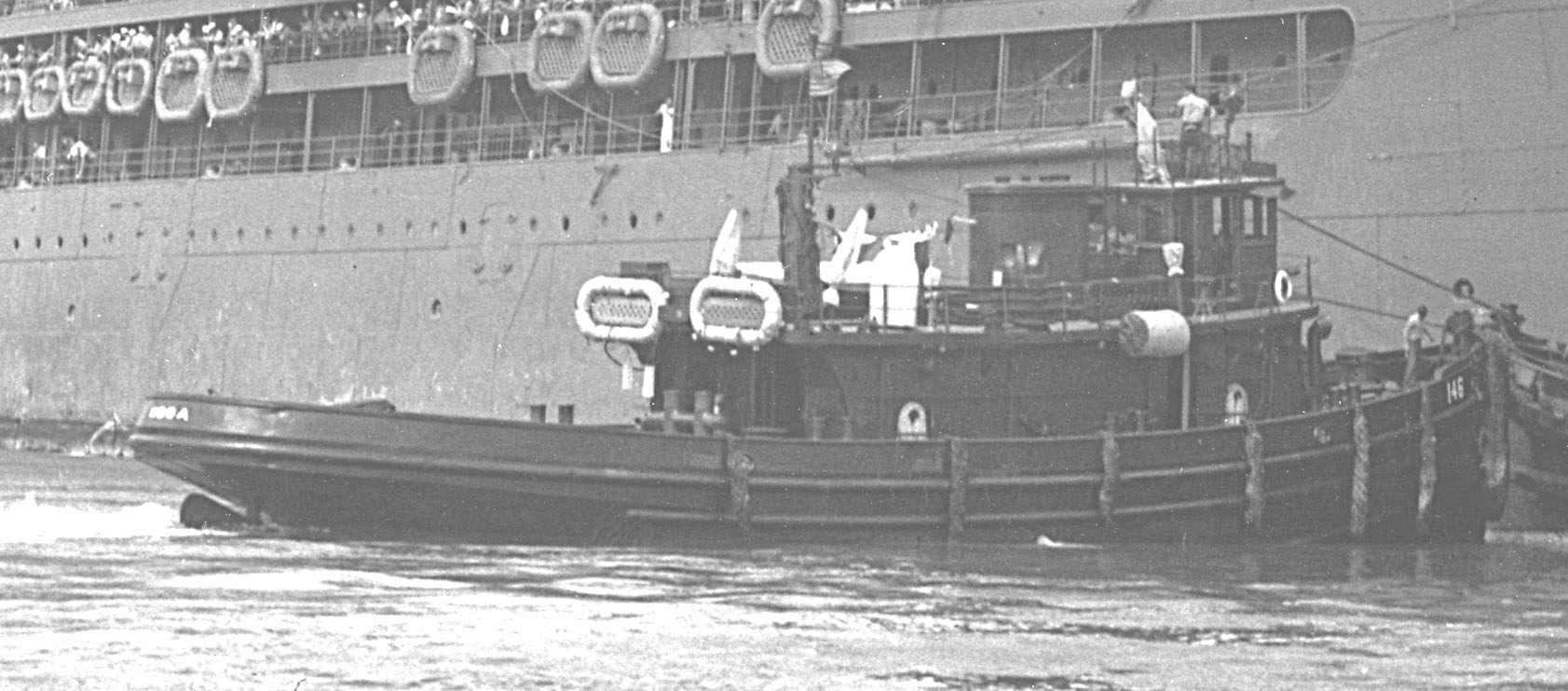
- Woban Class District Harbor Tug at Pearl Harbor in 1942
  Baylander (IX-514): United States Navy Helicopter Landing Trainer laid down by PACECO on December 28, 1967, as Yard No. 238, in Alameda.
- Alki Fire Boat
- Snoqualmie (fireboat)
- Five Woban Class District Harbor Tug: Mawkaw (YT 182), Negwagon (YT 188), Nepanet (YT 189), Orono (YT 190) and Osamekin (YT 191). Each with a displacement of 237 tons, a length of 100 feet, a beam 28 feet, a draft 9 feet. Top speed 12 kts, crew of 17 and power from a Diesel-electric, single propeller with 1,000 shp.
- 12 YFU US Navy Utility Boat 180 tons. YFU 71 to YFU 82 in 1967 and 1968.
- LCU 1637 a US Navy Landing Craft at 190 tons in 1970, This ship the only one in it class, with a sea simulator platform (ASSP), and was crewed civilians from the Radio Corp. of America (RCA).
- Carquinez Ferry at 537 tons, built in 1956, later renamed Blackbeard then Noble Phoenix. State of California ran between Martinez and Benicia until 1962. A length of 169 feet, a beam of 52 feet and a depth of 13.5 feet with a diesel engine, 1,000 hp.

== See also ==
- California during World War II
- Maritime history of California
- Union Iron Works
- Richmond Shipyards
- Kneass Boat Works
- Pacific Bridge Company
