= Baylander (IX-514) =

US Navy helicopter landing trainer

Coordinates: 40.819171°N 73.962104°W

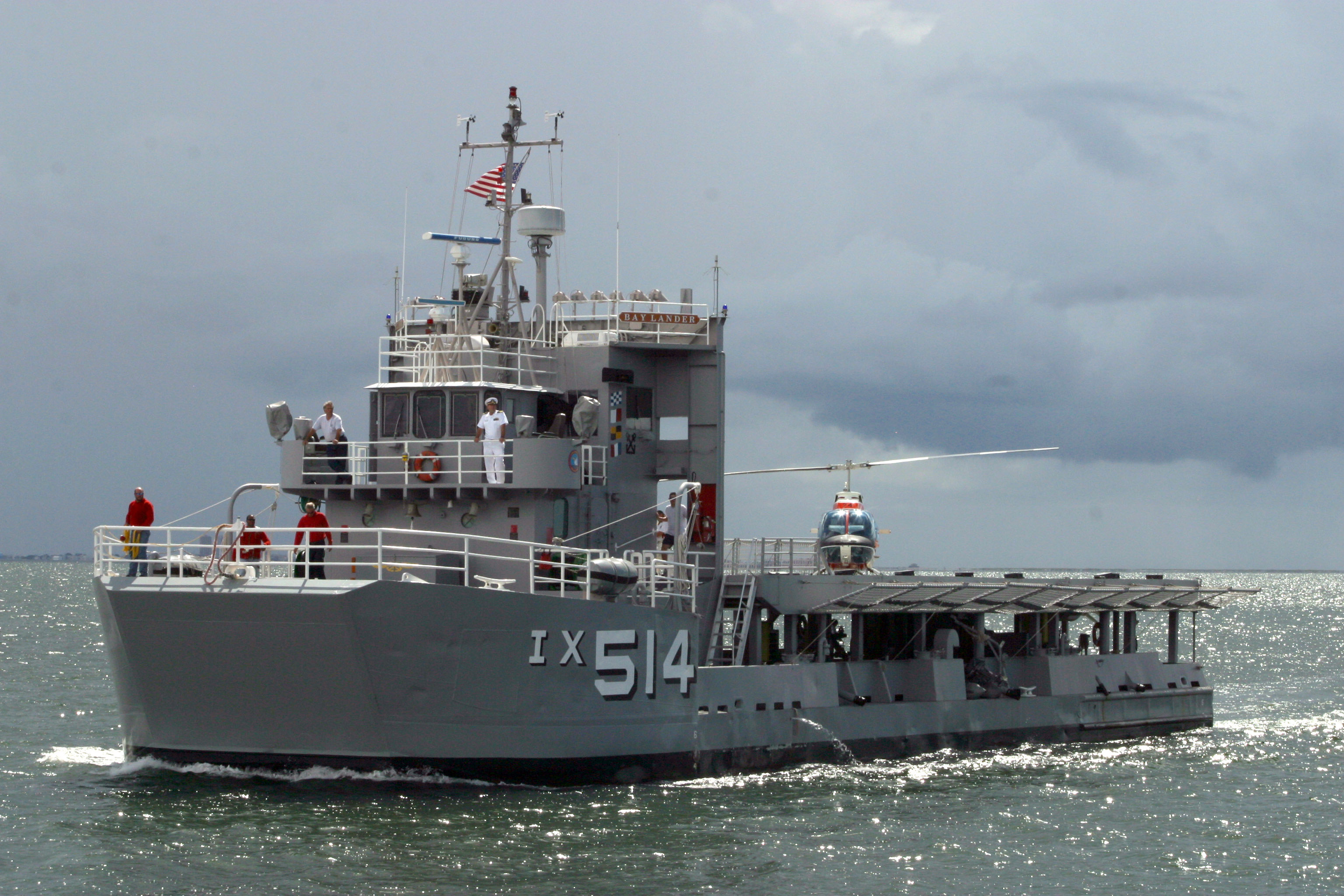
- Baylander while it was stationed at NAS Whiting Field, Florida

History

United States
- Name: YFU-79
- Owner: United States Navy
- Awarded: 1 June 1967
- Builder: Pacific Coast Engineering Alameda, California
- Yard number: 238
- Laid down: 28 December 1967
- Launched: 29 May 1968
- Acquired: 5 July 1968

United States
- Owner: United States Army
- Acquired: May–June 1970
- Out of service: mid-1980s

United States
- Name: Baylander (IX-514)
- Owner: United States Navy
- Acquired: mid-1980s
- In service: 31 March 1986
- Stricken: 15 December 2011
- Identification: Call sign: NHLT
- Status: Privately owned; science outreach for Billion Oyster Project; moored at West Harlem Piers, New York

General characteristics
- Class & type: YFU-71-class lighter
- Tonnage: 160 DWT
- Displacement: 380 long tons (full load); 220 long tons (light load)
- Length: 125 ft (38 m)
- Beam: 36 ft (11 m)
- Draft: 7.5 ft (2.3 m)
- Installed power: 2 × 450 hp (340 kW) Detroit Diesel 12V-71
- Propulsion: 2 × propellers
- Speed: 9 knots (10 mph; 17 km/h)
- Complement: 2 officer, 10 enlisted
- Aviation facilities: Helo deck (no hangar)

Baylander (IX-514), ex-YFU-79, was a United States Navy Helicopter Landing Trainer (HLT), billed as the world's smallest aircraft carrier. It served as a practice landing site for helicopter pilots in the United States Navy, Army, Air Force, Marine Corps, Coast Guard, and National Guard.

== History ==
The ship entered operations with the United States Navy in 1968 as harbor utility craft YFU-79 and served in the Vietnam War; from mid-1970 it served with the United States Army. At the end of the war YFU-79 was withdrawn to Guam. In the mid-1980s it was returned to the Navy and converted to a Helicopter Landing Trainer by Bender Shipbuilding in Mobile, Alabama, entering service on 31 March 1986 at Naval Air Station Pensacola, Florida. By August 2006, she had achieved 100,000 accident-free helicopter landings, and by the time of her retirement had surpassed 120,000 landings. After being taken out of service and struck from the Naval Register in 2011, Baylander was sold into private hands instead of being scrapped. In 2014, it was moved to the Brooklyn Bridge Park Marina in New York City and opened as a museum ship. By mid-2016, the vessel had been relocated to the West Harlem Piers on the Hudson River. As of July 2020, the Baylander serves as a restaurant and bar called "The Baylander."

== Specifications ==
Baylander was built as Yard No. 238 by Pacific Coast Engineering (PACECO) of Alameda, California. It is 125 feet (38 m) long, has a beam of 36 feet (11 m), and displaces 380 long tons (386 t) at full load. Its helicopter deck was the same size as that of a Oliver Hazard Perry-class frigate.
