= Chief Seattle (fireboat) =

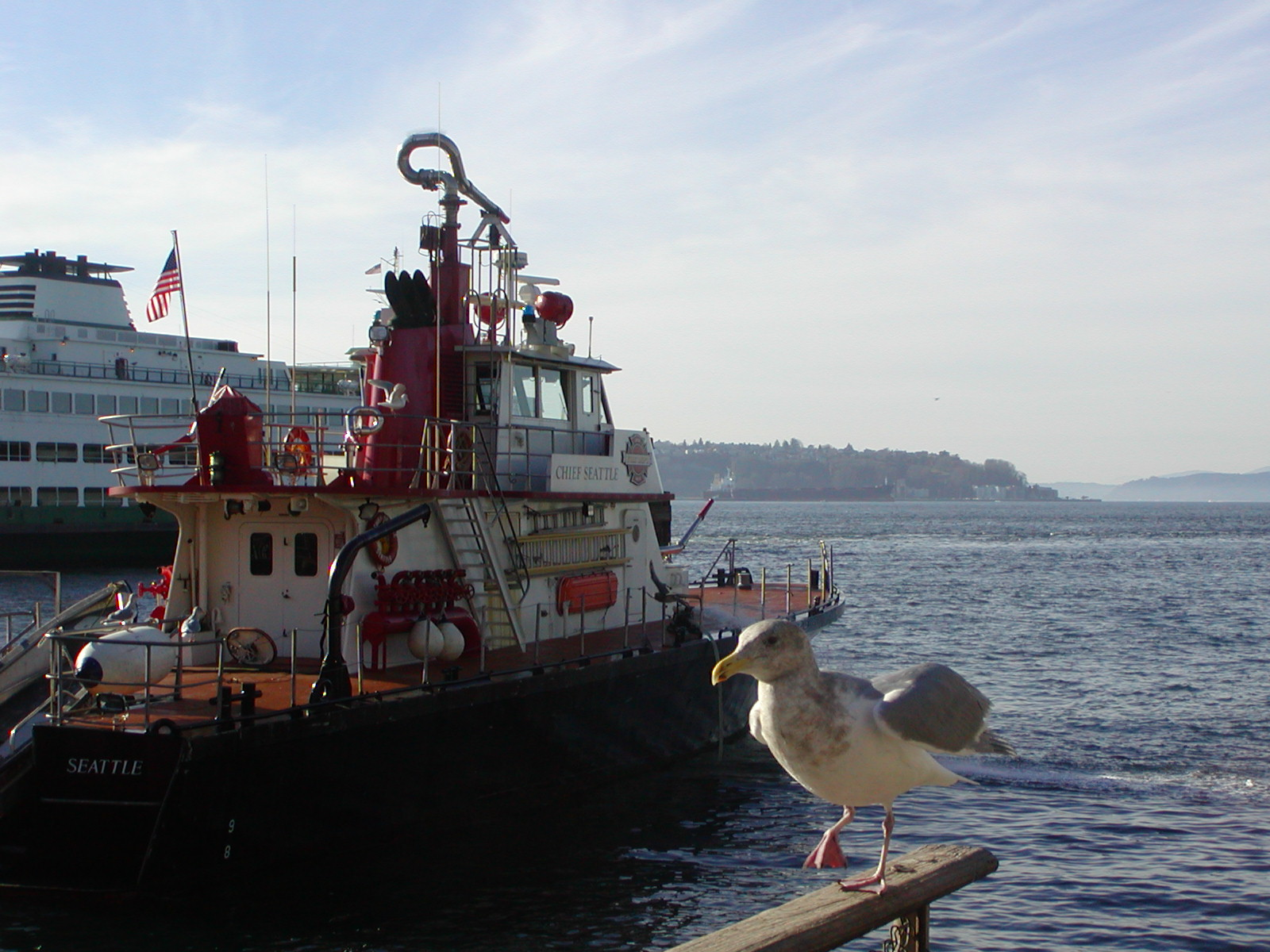
- Chief Seattle docked in Elliott Bay in 2006

History
- Name: Chief Seattle
- Operator: Seattle Fire Department
- Completed: 1984
- In service: 1985
- Status: In active service

General characteristics
- Type: Fireboat
- Length: 96 ft (29.3 m)
- Speed: 20 knots (37 km/h; 23 mph)

MV Chief Seattle is a fireboat named for Chief Seattle operated by the Seattle Fire Department (SFD). It is one of four fireboats operated by the SFD, the others being Leschi and Fireboat One, and Fireboat Two. Chief Seattle was built in 1984 and commissioned the following year.

The 96-foot (29.3 m) Chief Seattle has a top speed of 20 knots (37 km/h; 23 mph). The ship was refurbished and refitted in 2013 with the aim of extending its service life until 2033. Chief Seattle is regularly docked at Fishermen's Terminal where it serves as Seattle's primary freshwater firefighting vehicle.
