= Snoqualmie (fireboat) =

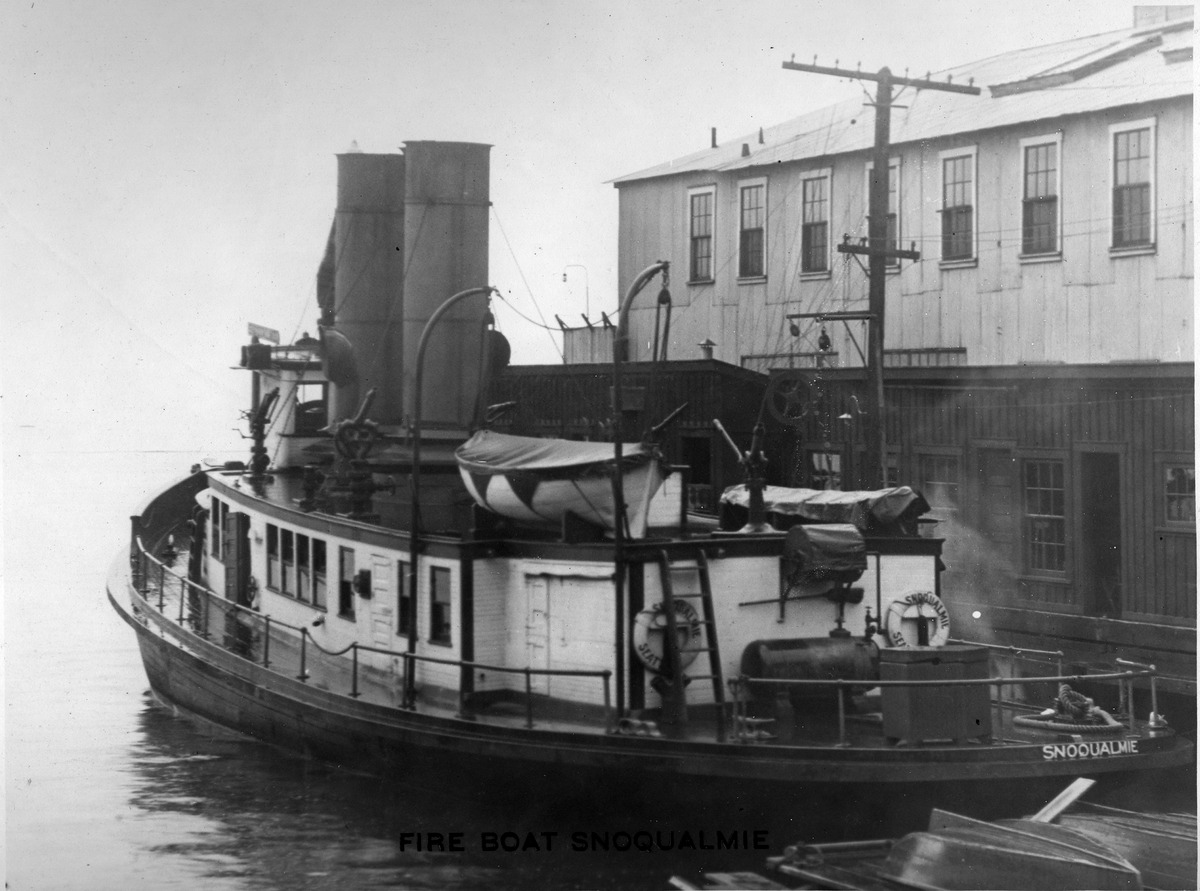
- Snoqualmie at her moorings in 1920
- Name: Snoqualmie
- Builder: Pacific Coast Engineering
- Launched: 1891
- Out of service: 1935

Snoqualmie was Seattle's first fireboat. She was the first fireboat on North America's west coast. She was launched in 1891, as a 98-foot (30 m)-long, wooden-hulled, steam-powered vessel. She was taken out of service, and rebuilt when Seattle completed its second fireboat, Duwamish, in 1909. Her coal-fueled boilers were replaced with oil-fueled ones. The retrofit included altering her profile. She had a new superstructure, and the replacement of her boiler meant replacing her original single smokestack with a pair of smokestacks. She was built by Pacific Coast Engineering.

She was replaced, in front line service, by the more powerful, gasoline-powered Alki in 1927. Snoqualmie was demoted to patrolling Lake Union. Since Lake Union is not at sea level, fireboats stationed elsewhere have a long delay arriving at fires on or near Lake Union, because they have to transit canal locks. She was finally retired from service, in Seattle, in 1932, when the Great Depression made maintaining her too much of a burden. Seattle sold her in 1935, for her value as scrap metal -- $1,800. She nevertheless remained afloat, and in use, for almost another four decades.

According to Alaska Shipwrecks: 1750-2010, Snoqualmie was destroyed by a fire, at Kodiak, Alaska, on March 6, 1974. It stated that, after her retirement from Seattle, she had been re-used for a variety of purposes. Prior to the fire she was being used as a shrimp hauler. A United States Coast Guard vessel towed her away from a Kodiak re-fueling dock, to a point where she could be left to burn out without posing further danger. Observers said she burned for 36 hours.
