= Alki (boat) =

Historic Seattle fireboat

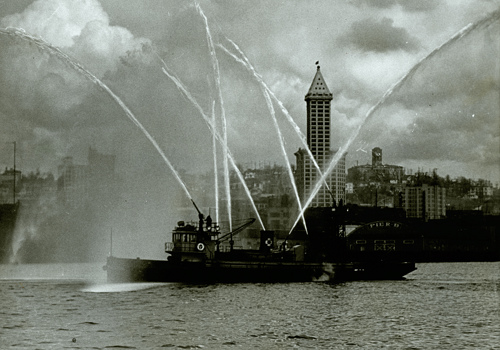
- Alki showing off in 1940
- Name: Alki
- Builder: Pacific Coast Engineering
- Launched: 1927
- Out of service: 2013

General characteristics
- Tonnage: 196 GT; 133 NT
- Length: 118 ft (36 m)
- Beam: 26 ft (7.9 m)
- Depth: 10.8 ft (3.3 m)
- Propulsion: Two Cleveland 500 hp (370 kW) diesel engines

Alki is a fireboat noted for its long service in Seattle, Washington. The boat was built in 1927 and is 123 feet (37 m) long. She was Seattle's third fireboat. She was built with gasoline engines, which were replaced with diesels in 1947. The new engine retrofit allowed Alki to increase its pumping capacity from 12,000 US gallons (45,000 L; 10,000 imp gal) per minute to 16,200 US gallons (61,000 L; 13,500 imp gal) per minute. She replaced Snoqualmie, Seattle's first fireboat.

Seattle sits on both Puget Sound and a series of freshwater lakes, including Lake Union and Lake Washington. In 2002, after a large fire, where thirty vessels were destroyed, firefighting authorities decided to permanently station a fireboat on the lakes, because it takes an hour for a fireboat to traverse the locks between the lakes and the ocean. Alki was the vessel chosen.

The boat was taken out of service and auctioned online beginning March 4, 2013. It was stipulated by the city ahead of time that the high bidder must meet certain requirements, including appropriate insurance and moorage. The vessel was sold for $71,000 on March 14, 2013, to an anonymous buyer, who subsequently backed out, when he or she found that new insurance for the vessel could not be obtained without a third party survey of fitness. The city looked into selling the vessel to lower bidders, but none of them seemed to have the financial backing to maintain the vessel.

In June Seattle paid for a survey, and some minor repairs, and announced plans to offer the vessel for sale again, this time at a live auction. In August 2014 Craig Mullen, the fourth owner in the year since Seattle sold the vessel, admitted falling behind in the mortgage payments for Alki, and said he feared he might have to break up the historic vessel, and sell off its parts. Mullen bought Alki at auction from the Port of Skagit in May 2014. Mullen's asking price was $50,000—exactly twice what the vessel had sold for, at Seattle's live auction, a year earlier. Alki began the process of being scrapped on April 13, 2020, at Tacoma, Washington.
