= Seattle Fire Department =

Municipal agency in Washington, US

Coordinates: 47°36′00″N 122°19′55″W

Operational area
- Country: United States
- State: Washington
- City: Seattle

Agency overview
- Established: 1889
- Annual calls: 191,112 (2018)
- Employees: 1,065 total employees; • 981 uniformed personnel; • 84 civilian employees
- Staffing: Career
- IAFF: 27, 2898

Facilities and equipment
- Battalions: 6
- Stations: 34
- Engines: 32
- Tillers: 13
- Rescues: 1
- Ambulances: 8 ALS (Advanced Life Support); 6 BLS (Basic Life Support)
- HAZMAT: 1
- USAR: 1
- Wildland: 1
- Fireboats: 4
- Rescue boats: 1

Website
- Official website
- IAFF website

The Seattle Fire Department provides fire protection and emergency medical services to the city of Seattle, Washington, United States. The department is responsible for an area of 142.5 square miles (369 km^{2}), including 193 miles (311 km) of waterfront, with a population of 713,700. There is a total of 1,065 employees with 981 uniformed personnel and 84 civilian employees.

== History ==
The Seattle Fire Department started as a volunteer fire department that was taken over by the City of Seattle on April 11, 1884. On June 6, 1889, the Great Seattle Fire broke out and destroyed over 64 acres (26 ha) of the city. Insurance investigators charged the city with not having adequately trained firefighters to provide protection for the residents. As a result, the Seattle Fire Department was officially established on October 17, 1889, as a paid professional department.

The Seattle Fire Department is contracted with American Medical Response for basic life support transport.

== Fire stations and apparatus ==
As of April 2021, the department operates out of 34 fire stations spread across the city.

Fire Station Number	Location	Address	Engine Company	Ladder Company	Aid or Medic Units	Special Units	Chief or Supervisor Units
2	Belltown	2320 4th Ave.	Engine 2	Ladder 4	Aid 2 Aid 4 (Staffed Part Time)	Mobile Integrated Health Unit 2 (H2)	
3	Fishermen's Terminal	1735 W Thurman St.				Fireboat 1 Fireboat Chief Seattle (FB3)	
5	Waterfront	925 Alaskan Way	Engine 5			Engine 4 transport unit Fireboat Leschi (FB4) Fireboat 2 Rescue Boat 5	
6	Central District	405 M L King Jr. Way. S	Engine 6	Ladder 3			
8	Queen Anne	110 Lee St.	Engine 8	Ladder 6			
9	Fremont	3829 Linden Ave. N	Engine 9				
10	International District	400 S Washington St.	Engine 10	Ladder 1	Aid 5 Aid 10	Hazardous Materials Unit 1 (HAZ1) Air Unit 10 (AIR10)	Staff & Incident Command System (ICS) Support Unit 10 (STAF10)
11	Highland Park	1514 SW Holden St.	Engine 11		Medic/Aid 84 (Reserve Medic/Aid Unit)		
13	Beacon Hill	3601 Beacon Ave. S	Engine 13				Battalion Chief 5
14	SoDo	3224 4th Ave. S	Rescue 1		Aid 14	Squad 14	
16	Greenlake	6846 Oswego Pl. NE	Engine 16				
17	University District	1050 NE 50th St.	Engine 17	Ladder 9	Medic 17		Battalion Chief 6
18	Ballard	1521 NW Market St.	Engine 18	Ladder 8	Medic 18	Hose & Foam Unit 18 (HOSE18)	Battalion Chief 4
20	Interbay	2800 15th Ave. W	Engine 20				
21	Greenwood	7304 Greenwood Ave. N	Engine 21			Mass Casualty Incident Unit 1 (MCI1)	
22	Montlake	901 E Roanoke St.	Engine 22		Aid 86 (Reserve Medic/Aid Unit)	Comm 1 (COM1)	
24	Bitter Lake	401 N 130th St.	Engine 24			Air Unit 240 (AIR240)	
25	Capitol Hill	1300 E Pine St.	Engine 25	Ladder 10	Aid 25	Mobile Ventilation Unit 1 (MVU1) Energy Response Unit 1 (ENERGY1) Power/CO_{2} Unit 25 (P25)	Battalion Chief 2
26	South Park	800 S Cloverdale St.	Engine 26		Medic 26	Mobile Air Compressor 260 (AIR260)	
27	Georgetown	1000 S Myrtle St.	Engine 27			Decontamination Unit 1 (DECON1) Rehabilitation Unit 1 (REHAB1)	
28	Rainier Valley	5968 Rainier Ave. S	Engine 28	Ladder 12	Medic 28 Metropolitan Medical Strike Team		
29	Admiral District	2139 Ferry Ave. SW	Engine 29				
30	Mount Baker	2931 S Mount Baker Blvd.	Engine 30			Mass Casualty Incident Unit 2 (MCI2)	
31	Northgate	10503 Interlake Avenue North (Temporary Station- Interim location until new station is complete)	Engine 31	Ladder 5	Medic 31	Aid 31 (Staffed Part Time)	
32	West Seattle	3715 SW Alaska St.	Engine 32	Ladder 11	Medic 32		Battalion Chief 7
33	Rainier Beach	9645 Renton Ave. S	Engine 33				
34	Madison Park	633 32nd Ave. E	Engine 34			Hose & Foam Unit 34 (HOSE34)	
35	Crown Hill	8729 15th Ave. NW	Engine 35				
36	Harbor Island	3600 23rd Ave. SW	Engine 36			Marine Unit 1 (MRN1) Marine Unit 80 (Reserve Marine Unit)	
37	High Point	7700 35th Ave. SW	Engine 37	Ladder 13			
38	Laurelhurst	4004 NE 55th St.	Engine 38 Engine 85 (Reserve Engine)			Squad & Wildland Unit 40 (S40)	
39	Lake City	2806 NE 127th St.	Engine 39			Medical Ambulance Bus 1 (MAB1)	
40	Wedgwood	9401 35th Ave. NE	Engine 40 Engine 84 (Reserve Engine)				
41	Magnolia	2416 34th Ave. W	Engine 41				
HMC	Harborview Medical Center	325 9th Ave.			Medic 1 Medic 10 Medic 80 (Reserve Medic Unit)	Medic 5 (Reserve Medic Unit)	Medic 44 & Medic 45 (EMS Supervisors) Battalion Chief 3 (EMS Battalion Chief)
HQ	Headquarters	301 2nd Ave. S				Public Information Officer (PIO) Fire Marshal 5 (MAR5)	Deputy Chief 1 (DEP1) Safety Chief 2 (SAFT2) Mobile Integrated Health Unit 1 (H1) Mobile Integrated Health Unit 99 (H99)

== Apparatus types and callsigns ==
- Engine (E)
- Ladder (L)
- Aid Unit "Aid Car" - Basic Life Support (A)
- Air / Mobile Air Compressor Unit (AIR)
- Battalion Chief (B)
- Chaplain Unit (CHAP)
- Command, Control & Communication Unit (COM)
- Decontamination Unit (DECON)
- Deputy Chief of Operations (DEP)
- EMS/Paramedic Supervisor (M44 / M45)
- Fire Boat (FB)
- Rescue Boat (RB)
- Fire Chief (234)
- Assistant Chief of Operations (89)
- Fire Investigation Unit (FIU) / Fire Marshal (MAR)
- Hazardous Materials Unit (HAZ)
- Hose / Foam Wagon (HOSE)
- Marine Unit (MRN)
- Medic - Advanced Life Support (M)
- Medical Ambulance Bus (MAB)
- Metropolitan Medical Strike Team (MMST)
- Mobile Ventilation Unit (MVU)
- Mass Casualty Incident Unit (MCI)
- Power/CO_{2} Unit (P)
- Public Information Officer (PIO)
- Reserve Aid - BLS Apparatus (All "80 Series" Designations) (A8_)
- Reserve Battalion Chiefs (B2_)
- Reserve Engine Apparatus (All "80 Series" Designations) (E8_)
- Reserve Ladder Apparatus (All "80 Series" Designations) (L8_)
- Reserve Medic - ALS Apparatus (All "80 Series" Designations) (M8_)
- Reserve Heavy Rescue Apparatus (All "80 Series" Designations) (R8_)
- Seattle Police Harbor Patrol Boat (Responds with Seattle Fire Department for most marine incidents) (PTRL)
- Squad & Wildland Unit (S)
- Staff & Incident Command System (ICS) Support Unit (STAF)
- Safety Chief (SAFT)
- Heavy Rescue Unit (R)
- Rehabilitation (REHAB)

== Notable incidents ==
1887 cast iron bell in Seattle

=== Great Seattle Fire ===
On June 6, 1889, the Great Seattle Fire broke out in a cabinet shop located at the corner of 1st Avenue and Madison Street. The flames spread rapidly and the small volunteer department was unable to slow the fire with the town's small water systems. By the time the fire was extinguished, 64 acres (26 ha) of homes and businesses had been destroyed.

=== Pang warehouse fire ===
On January 5, 1995, the Mary Pang's Food Products warehouse burned in the International District. Four firefighters died when the floor of the warehouse collapsed. It was later determined that the fire was set by Martin Pang, the son of the owner. Seattle's Fallen Firefighters Memorial was built to remember the four who perished.

== In popular culture ==
The House on the Hill (1985)

- In the 1965 film, The Slender Thread, starring Sidney Poitier and Anne Bancroft, the Seattle Fire Department dispatch center, as well as the interior of Fire Station # 2 are shown and Aid Unit 2 is seen responding to a report of a suicide attempt.
- In 1979, in the Emergency! TV series' movie-of-the-week "Most Deadly Passage", the main characters visit Seattle for a ride-along with Medic One. During the episode, a rescue is completed at the Kingdome, a skydiver leaps from the top of the Space Needle, and a fueling error causes a ferry to catch on fire in Elliott Bay.
- In 1985, the department released a cartoon film on fire safety, named The House on the Hill.
- The 2018 ABC television series Station 19, a spin-off of the Seattle-set medical drama Grey's Anatomy, is set in the department.
- In G.I. Joe, the Lifeline character is a paramedic with the SFD.

== Gallery ==
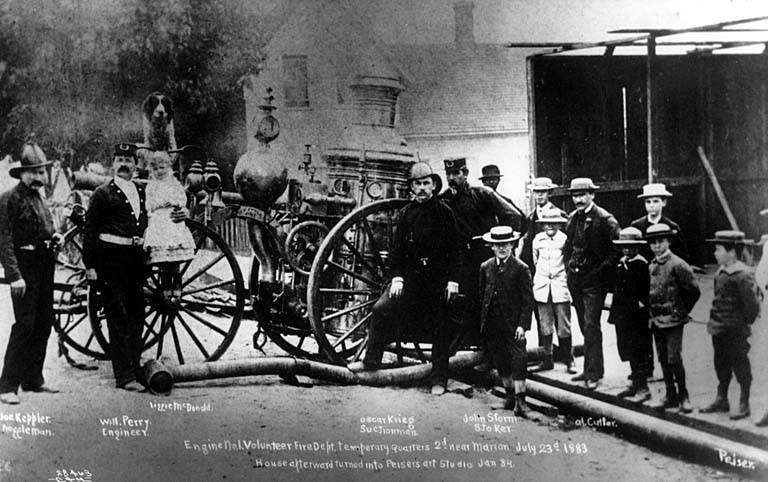
Seattle Volunteer Fire Company Engine Number 1 in 1883 at the engine house on Columbia Street in a Theodore Peiser photograph

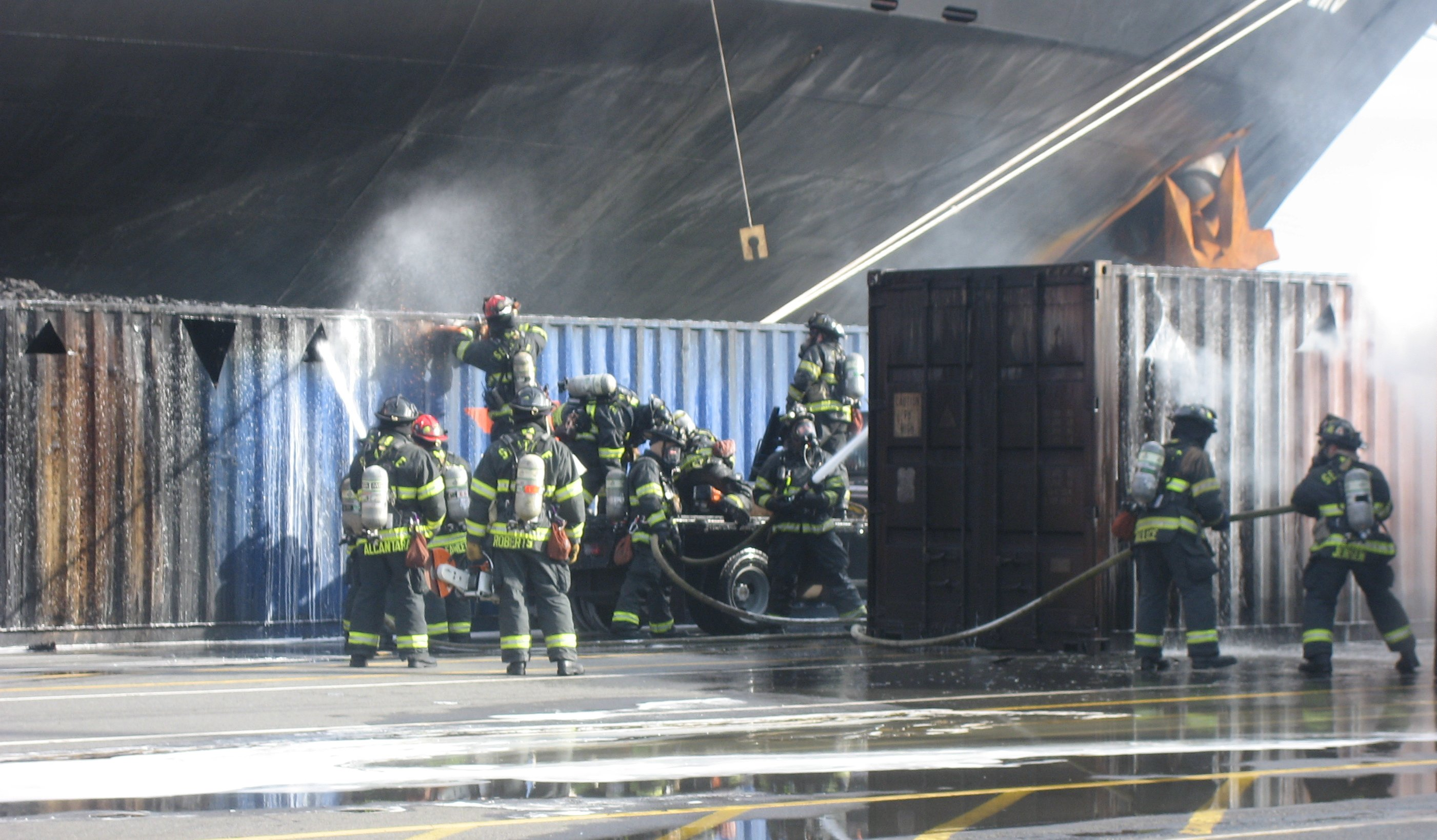
Seattle firefighters put out a cargo container fire in the Port of Seattle.

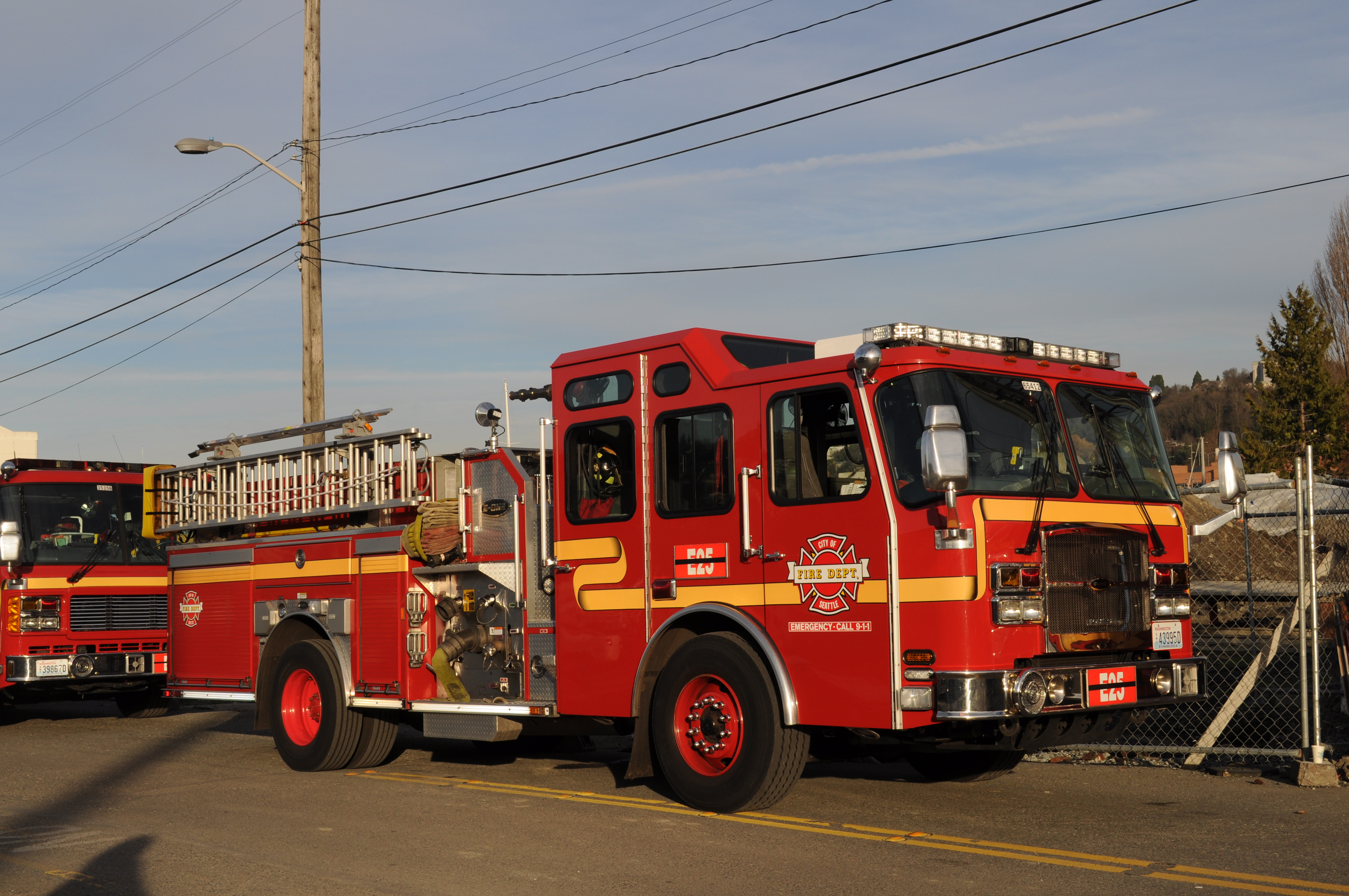
Seattle Fire Department Engine 25

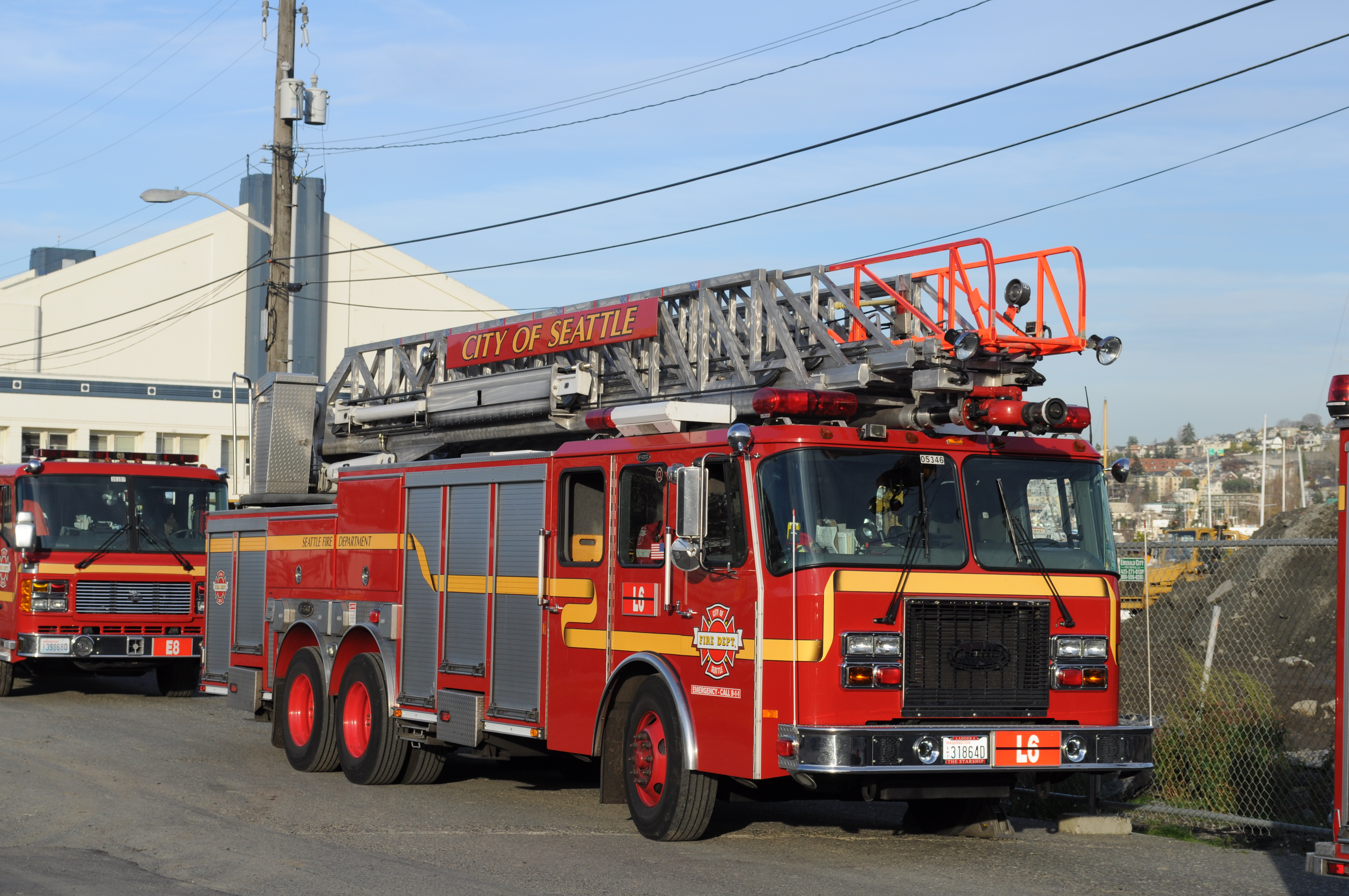
Seattle Fire Department Ladder 6

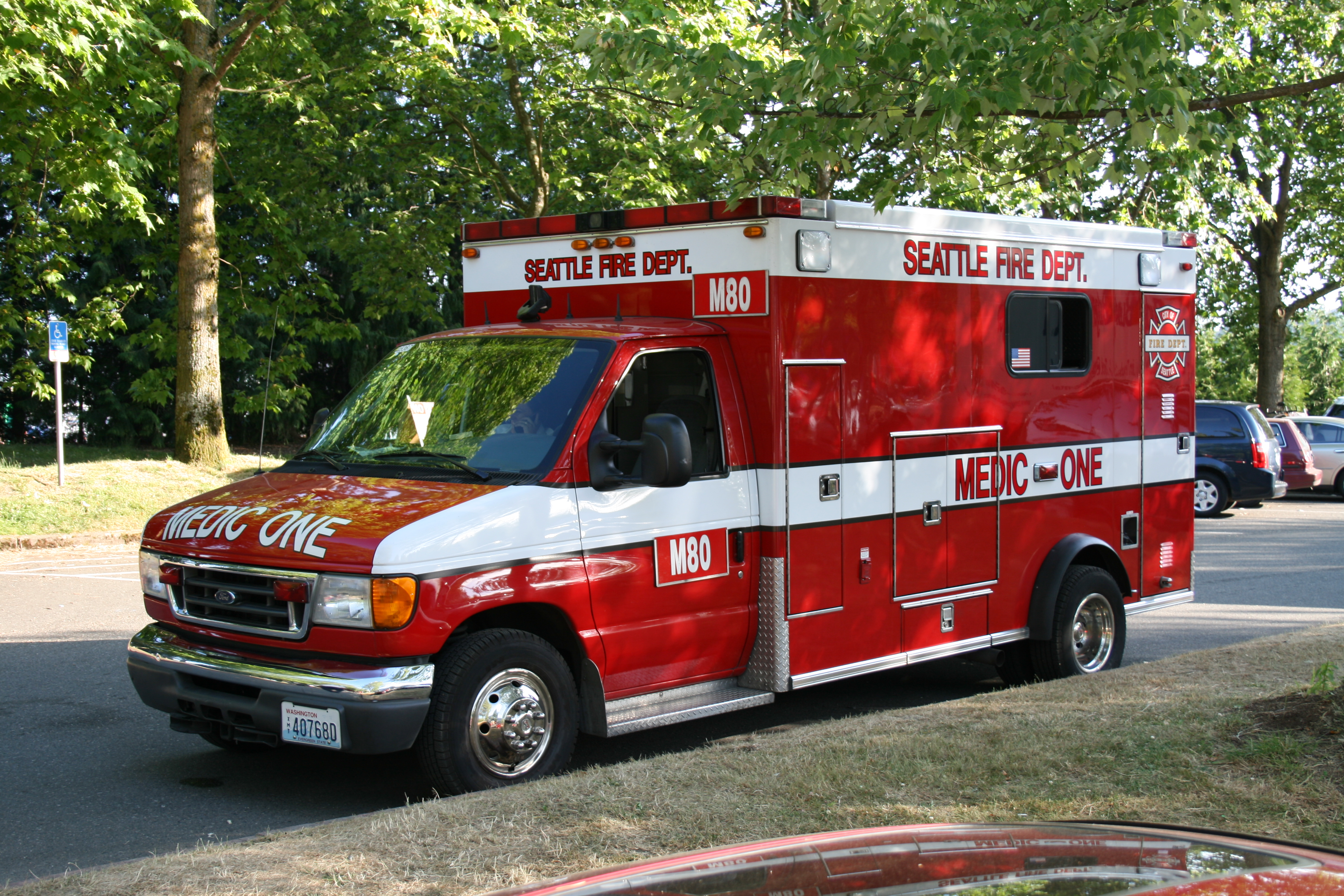
Seattle Fire Department Medic 80

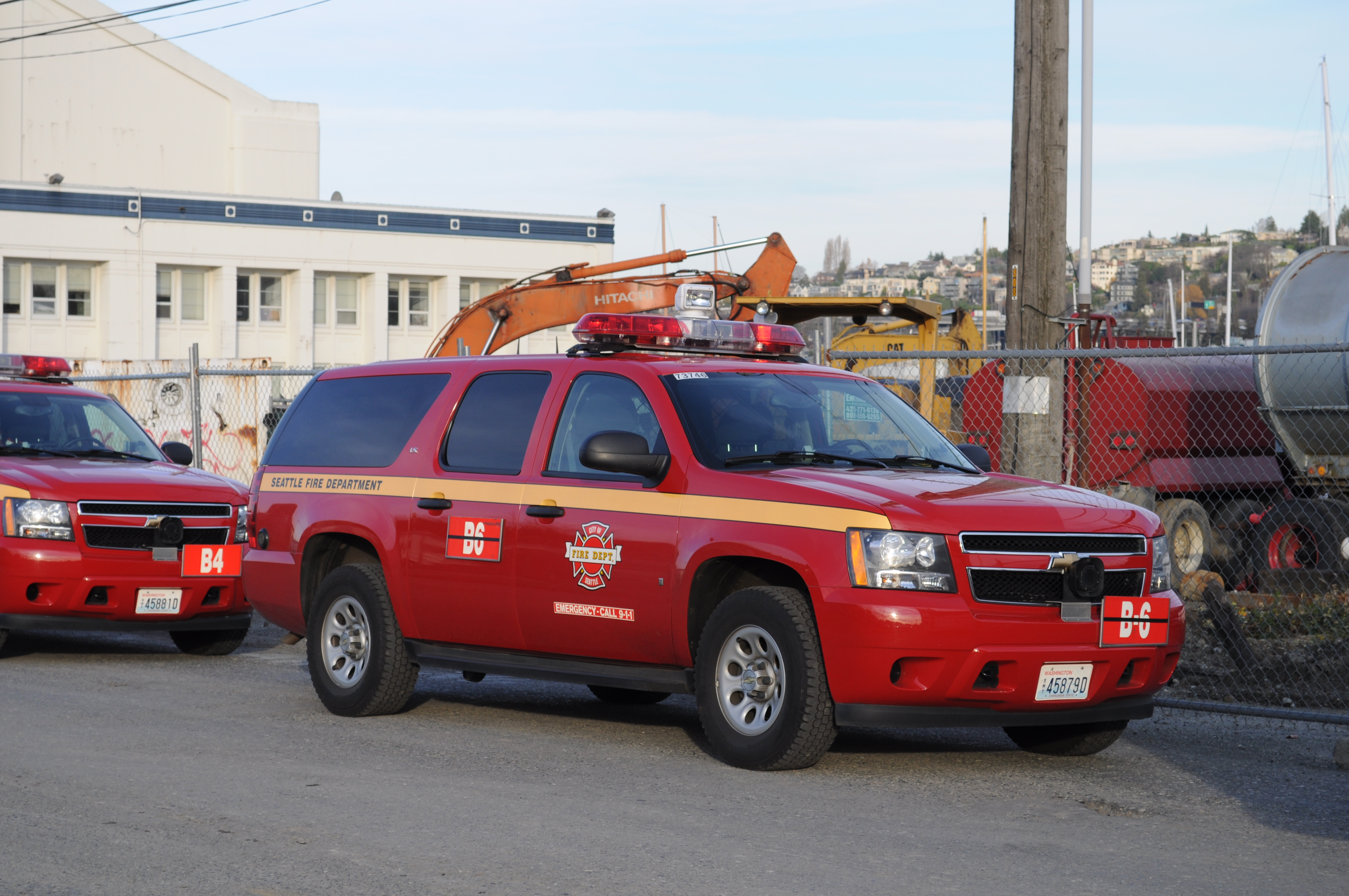
Seattle Fire Department Battalion 6

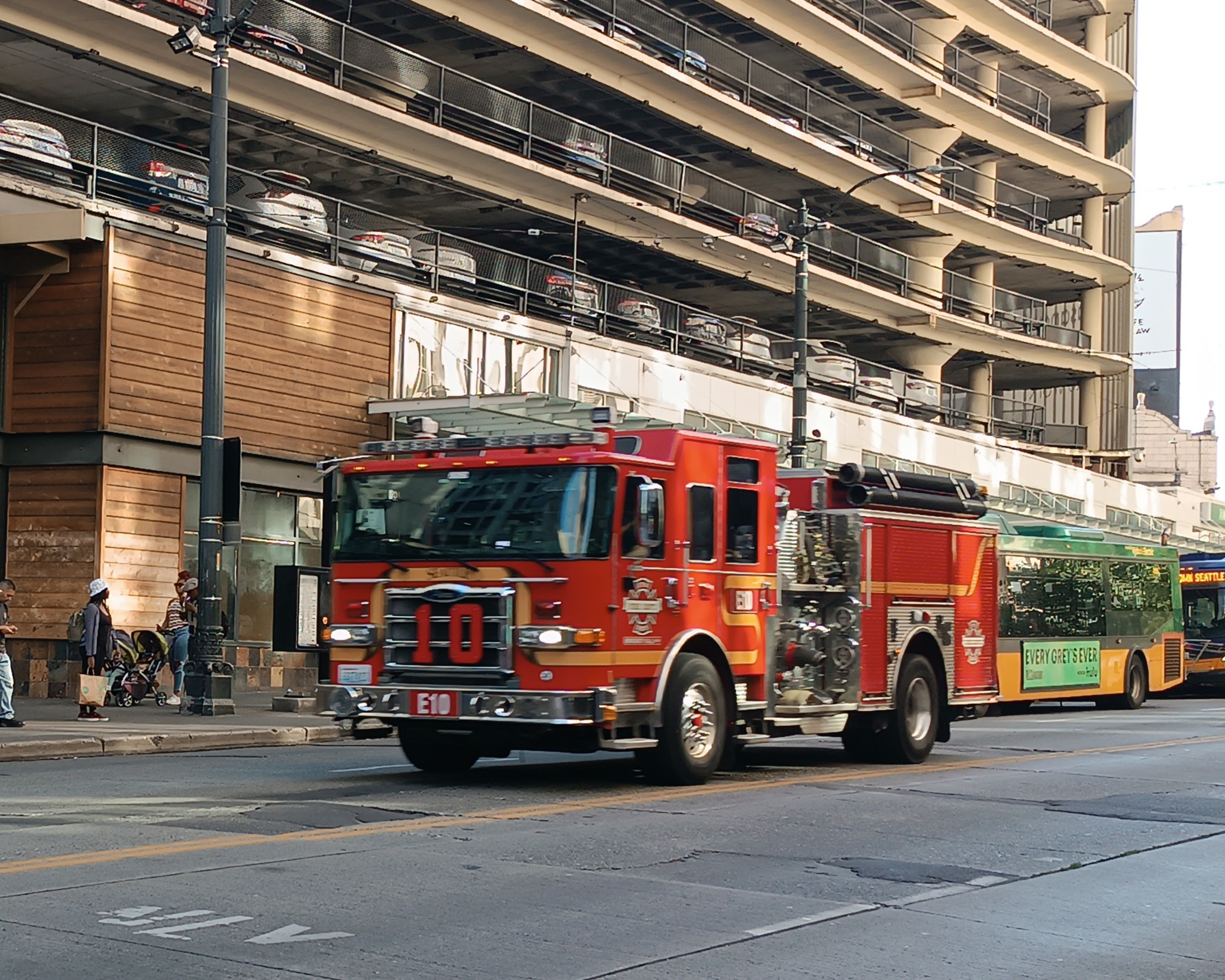
Seattle Fire Department Engine 10

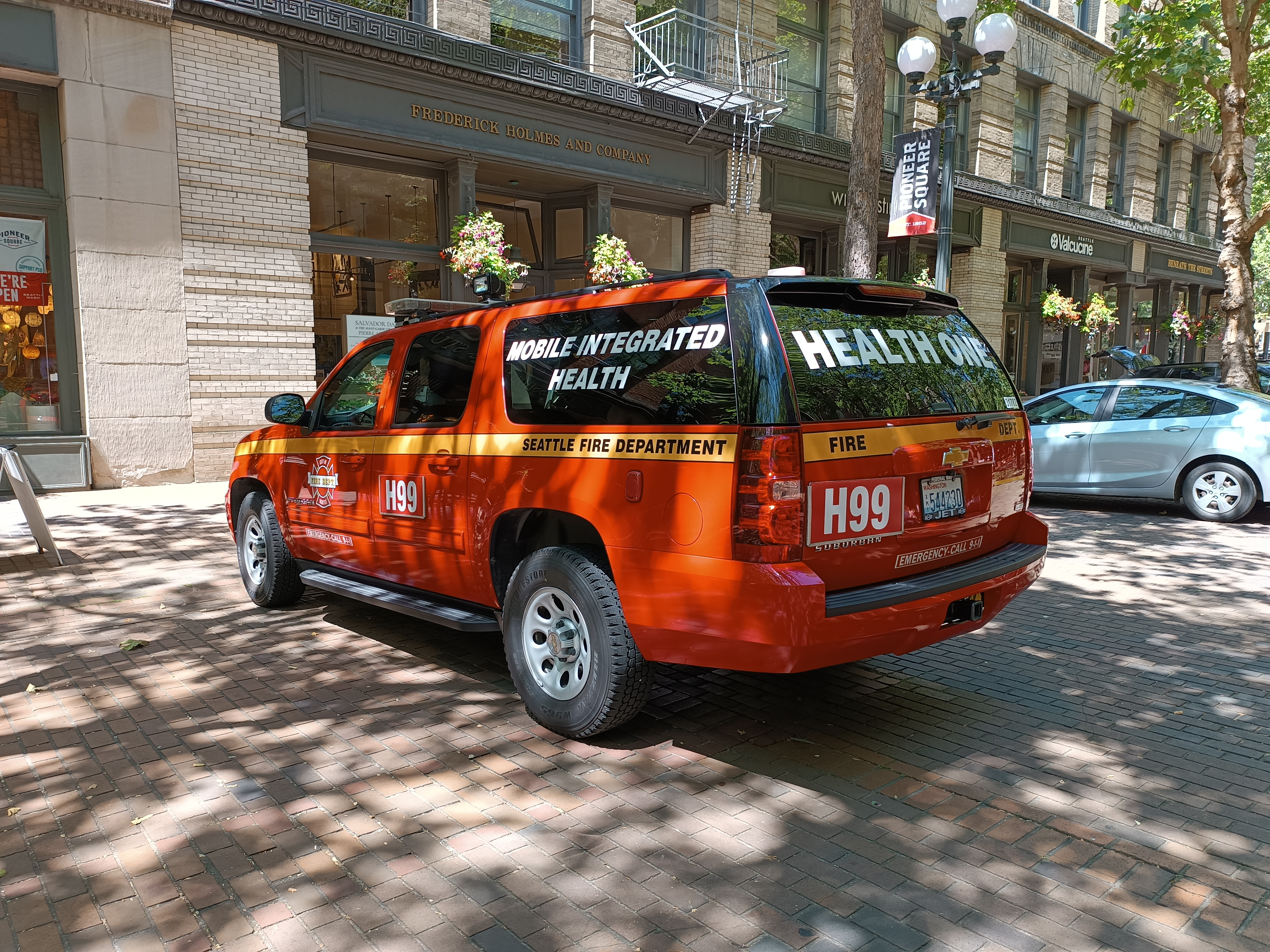
Seattle Fire Department Health One
