= Modern United States Navy carrier air operations =

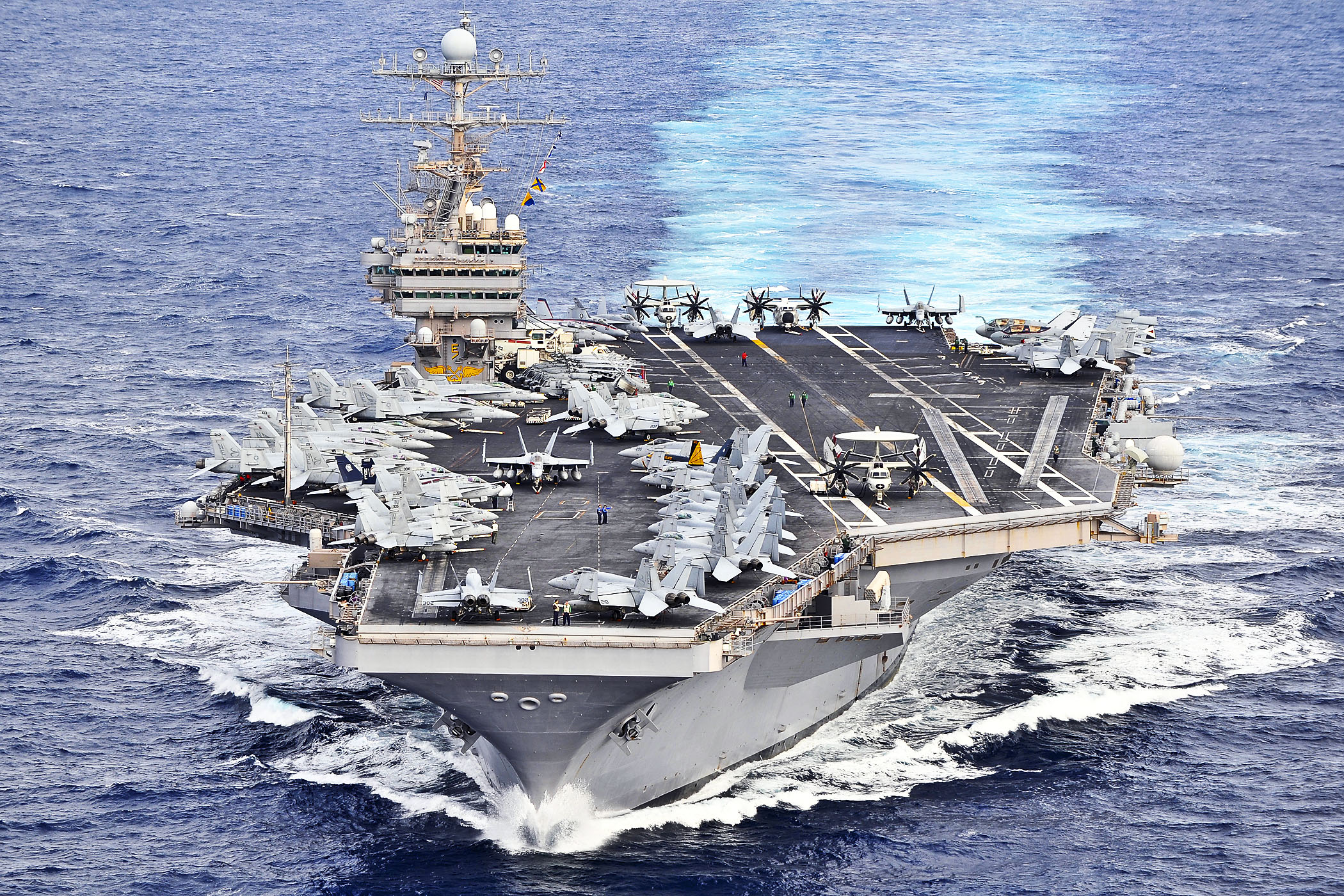
The flight deck of USS Abraham Lincoln

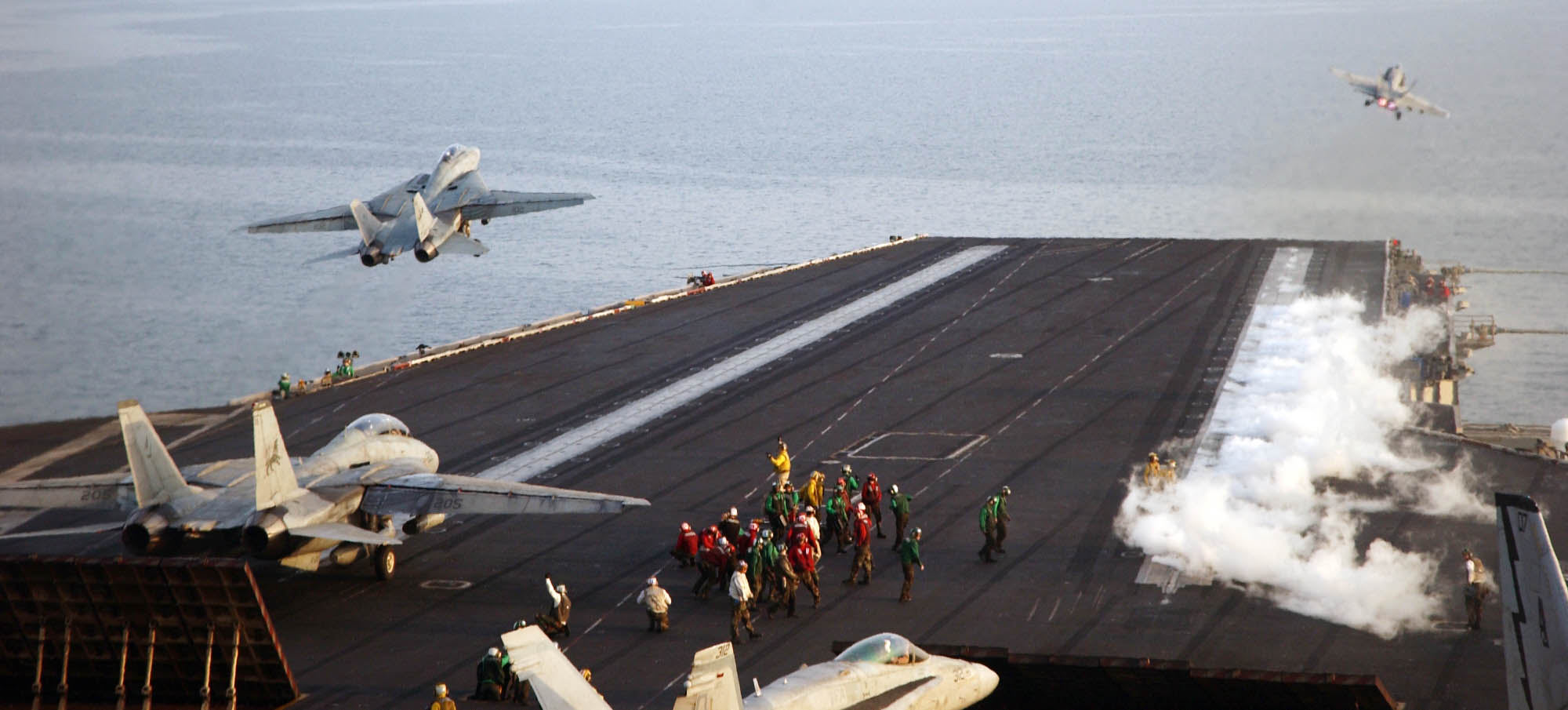
F-14D Tomcat launches from the flight deck of USS Theodore Roosevelt (CVN 71)

Modern United States Navy aircraft carrier air operations include the operation of fixed-wing and rotary aircraft on and around an aircraft carrier for performance of combat or noncombat missions. The carrier is usually the centerpiece of the carrier strike group. The flight operations are highly evolved, based on experiences dating back to 1922 with USS Langley.

== Flight deck crew ==
On an aircraft carrier flight deck, specialized crews are employed for the different roles utilized in managing air operations. The different flight deck crews wear colored jerseys to visually distinguish their functions.

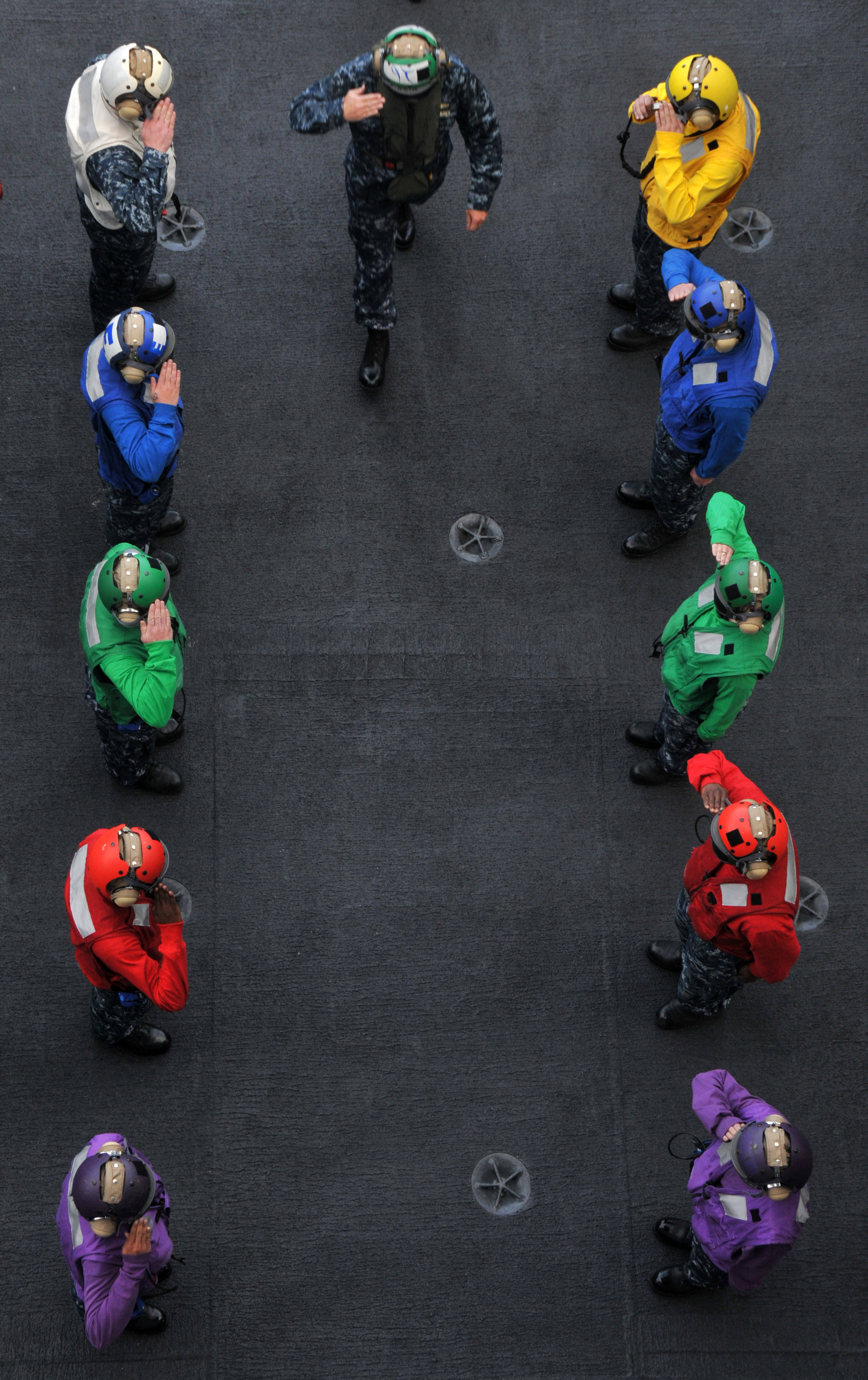
Vice Adm. Richard W. Hunt crosses the rainbow sideboys during an arrival aboard USS Abraham Lincoln

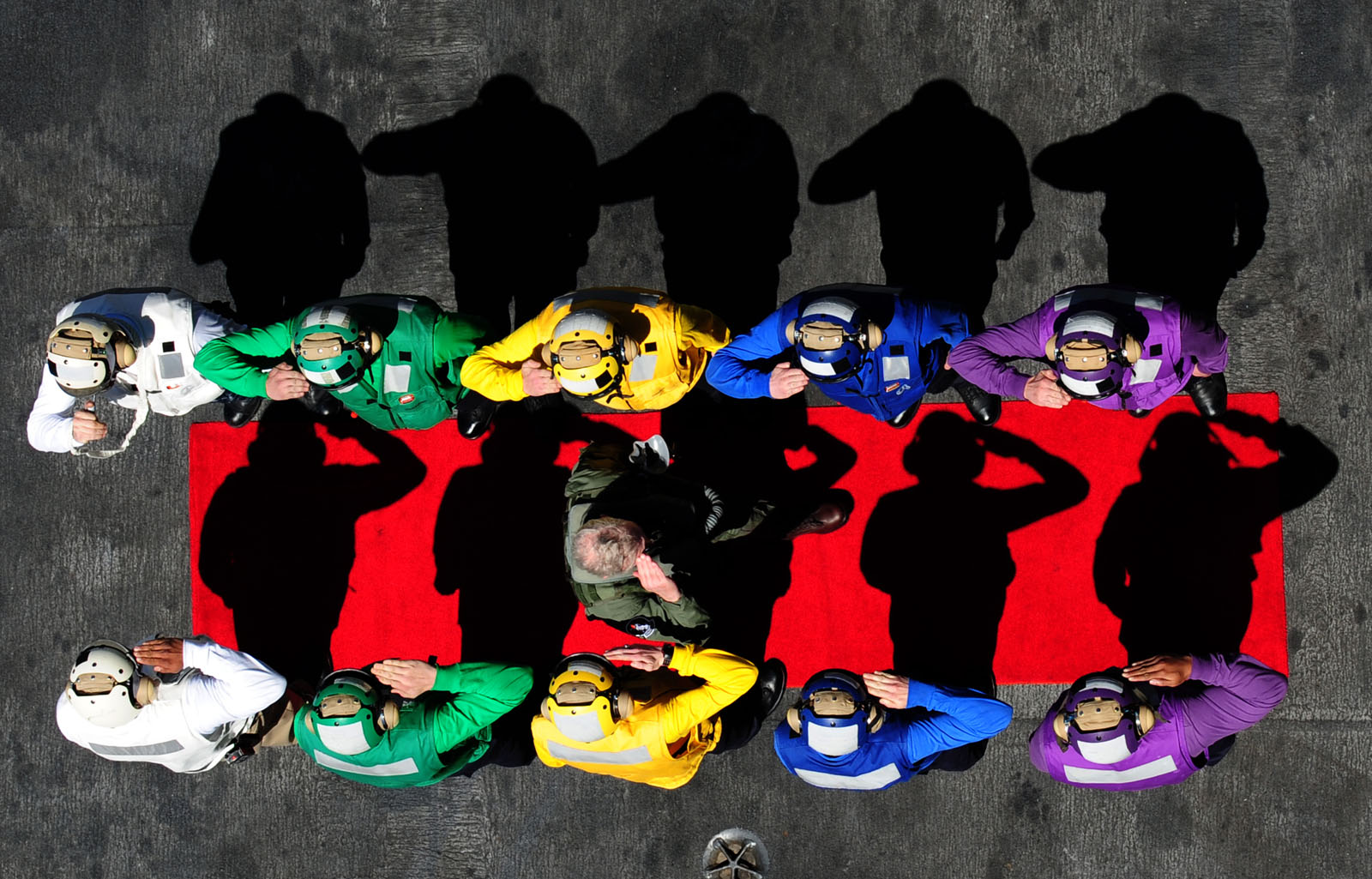
The rainbow sideboys salute as Secretary of the Navy Ray Mabus boards the Nimitz-class aircraft carrier USS John C. Stennis

US aircraft carrier: jack colors and tasks
Color	Role
Yellow	Aircraft handling officer; Catapult and arresting gear officer; Plane director – responsible for all movement of all aircraft on the flight/hangar deck
Green	Catapult and arresting gear crew; Visual landing aid electrician; Air wing maintainer; Air wing quality controller; Cargo-handler; Ground support equipment (GSE) troubleshooter; Hook runner; Photographer's mate; Helicopter landing signal enlisted personnel (LSE)
Red	Ordnance handler; Crash and salvage crew; Explosive ordnance disposal (EOD); Firefighter and damage control party
Purple	Aviation fuel handler
Blue	Trainee plane handler; Chocks and chains – entry-level flight-deck workers under the yellowshirts; Aircraft elevator operator; Tractor driver; Messengers and phone talker
Brown	Air wing plane captain – air wing squadron personnel who prepare aircraft for flight; Air wing line leading petty officer
White	Quality assurance (QA); Squadron plane inspector; Landing signal officer (LSO); Air transfer officer (ATO); Liquid oxygen (LOX) crew; Safety observer; Medical personnel (white with Red Cross emblem)

Everyone associated with the flight deck has a specific job, which is indicated by the color of their deck jersey, float coat and helmet. Rank is also denoted by the pattern of pants worn by flight deck crew:

- Navy blue pants – Denotes junior sailors and petty officers.
- Khaki pants – Denotes chief petty, warrant and commissioned officers. This keeps in line with the traditional khaki color of CPO and officer service uniforms.

When a Distinguished Visitor (DV) arrives on the ship by air, a call to "Muster the Rainbow Sideboys" is made. Typically two of each colored jersey stand opposite each other in front of the entrance to the ship to render honors to the DV. These sailors in their colored jerseys are referred to as "Rainbow Sideboys".

=== Air officer ===
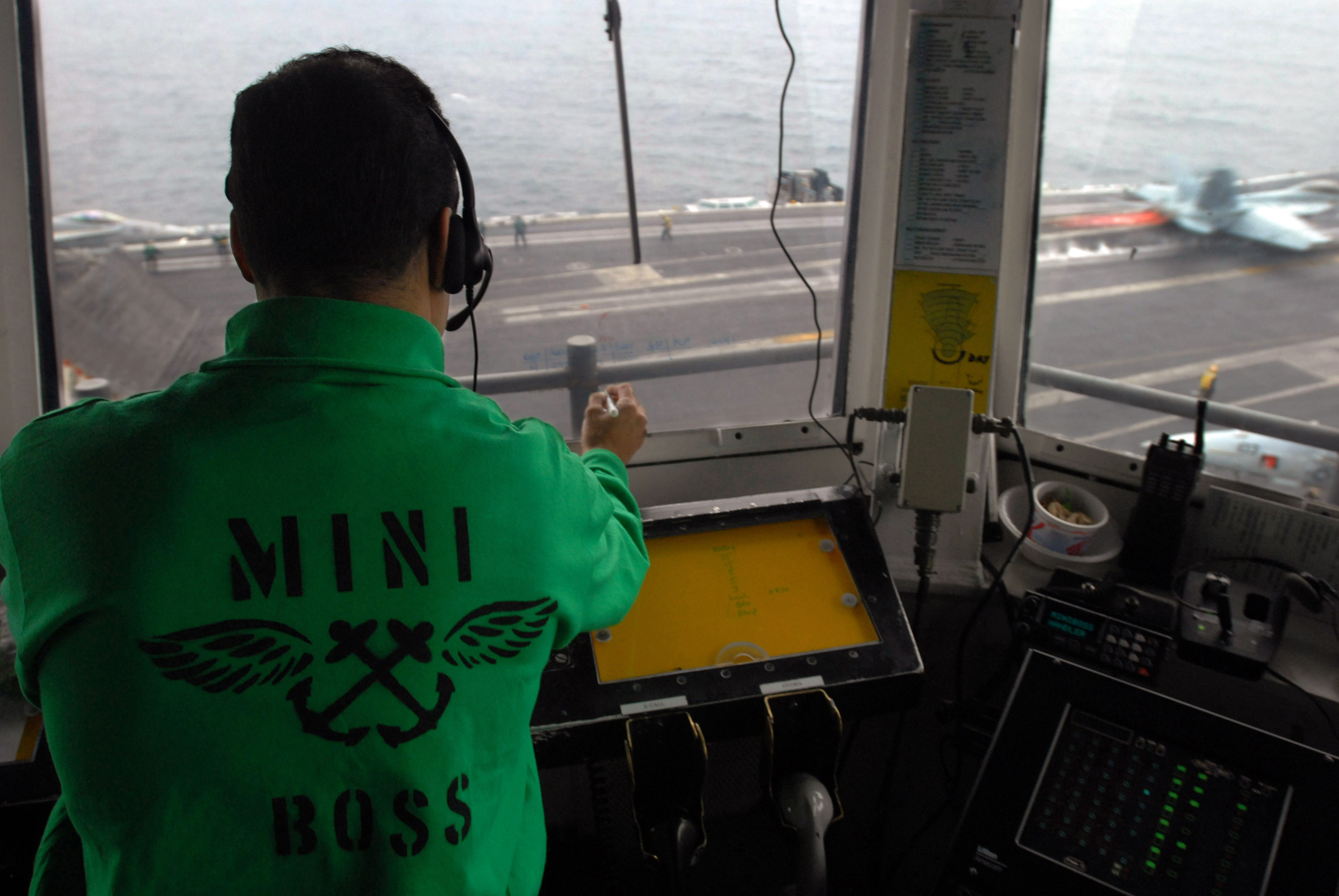
Alongside the air boss, the miniboss oversees flight operations from Primary Flight Control

Also known as the air boss, the air officer (along with his assistant, the miniboss) is responsible for all aspects of operations involving aircraft including the hangar deck, the flight deck, and airborne aircraft out to 5 nautical miles (9.3 km; 5.8 mi) from the carrier. From his perch in Primary Flight Control (PriFly, or the "tower"), he, along with his assistant, maintains visual control of all aircraft operating in the carrier control zone (surface to and including 2,500 feet (760 m), within a circular limit defined by 5 nautical miles (9.3 km; 5.8 mi) horizontal radius from the carrier), and aircraft desiring to operate within the control zone must obtain his approval prior to entry. This officer is typically a commander and is normally a former CVW squadron commander selected for promotion to captain.

The normal working jersey color of an air boss is yellow, but an air boss may wear any color jersey he pleases, as he represents everyone working on the flight deck, hangar bay, and aviation fuels personnel.

=== Catapult officer ===
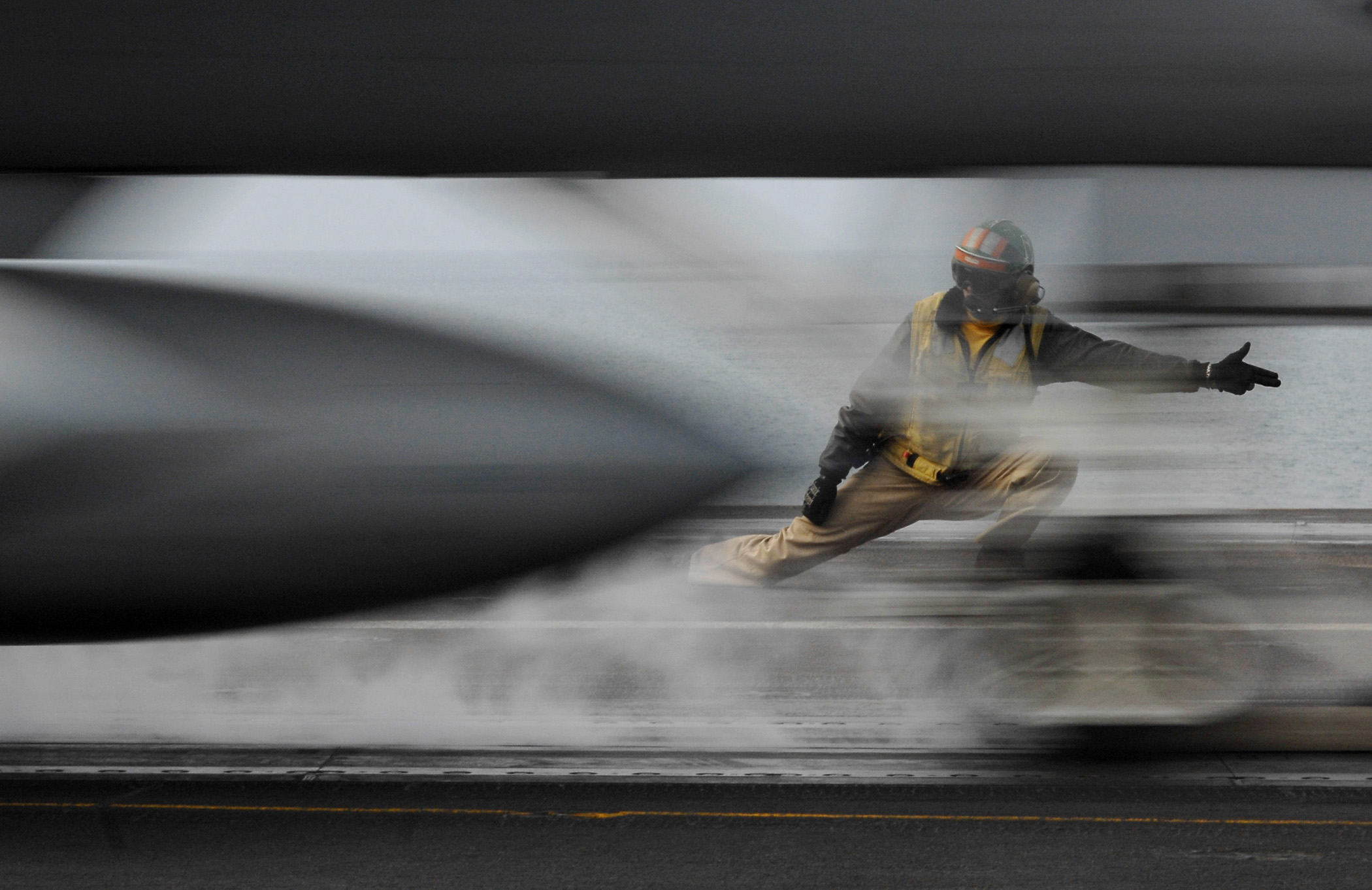
A shooter (also known as a catapult officer) gives the signal to launch an F/A-18.

Catapult officers, also known as shooters, are commissioned officers, and are responsible for all aspects of catapult maintenance and operation. They ensure that wind (direction and speed) is sufficient over the deck and that the steam settings for the catapults will ensure that aircraft have sufficient flying speed at the end of the stroke. They are also responsible for signaling to the pilot that they may take off.

=== Aircraft handling officer ===
Also known as the aircraft handler (ACHO, or just handler), the ACHO is responsible for arrangement of aircraft about the flight and hangar decks. The handler is charged with avoiding a "locked deck", where too many misplaced aircraft are around such that no more can land prior to a rearrangement. The handler works in Flight Deck Control, where scale-model aircraft on a flight deck representation are used to represent actual aircraft status on the flight deck.

=== Aircraft directors ===
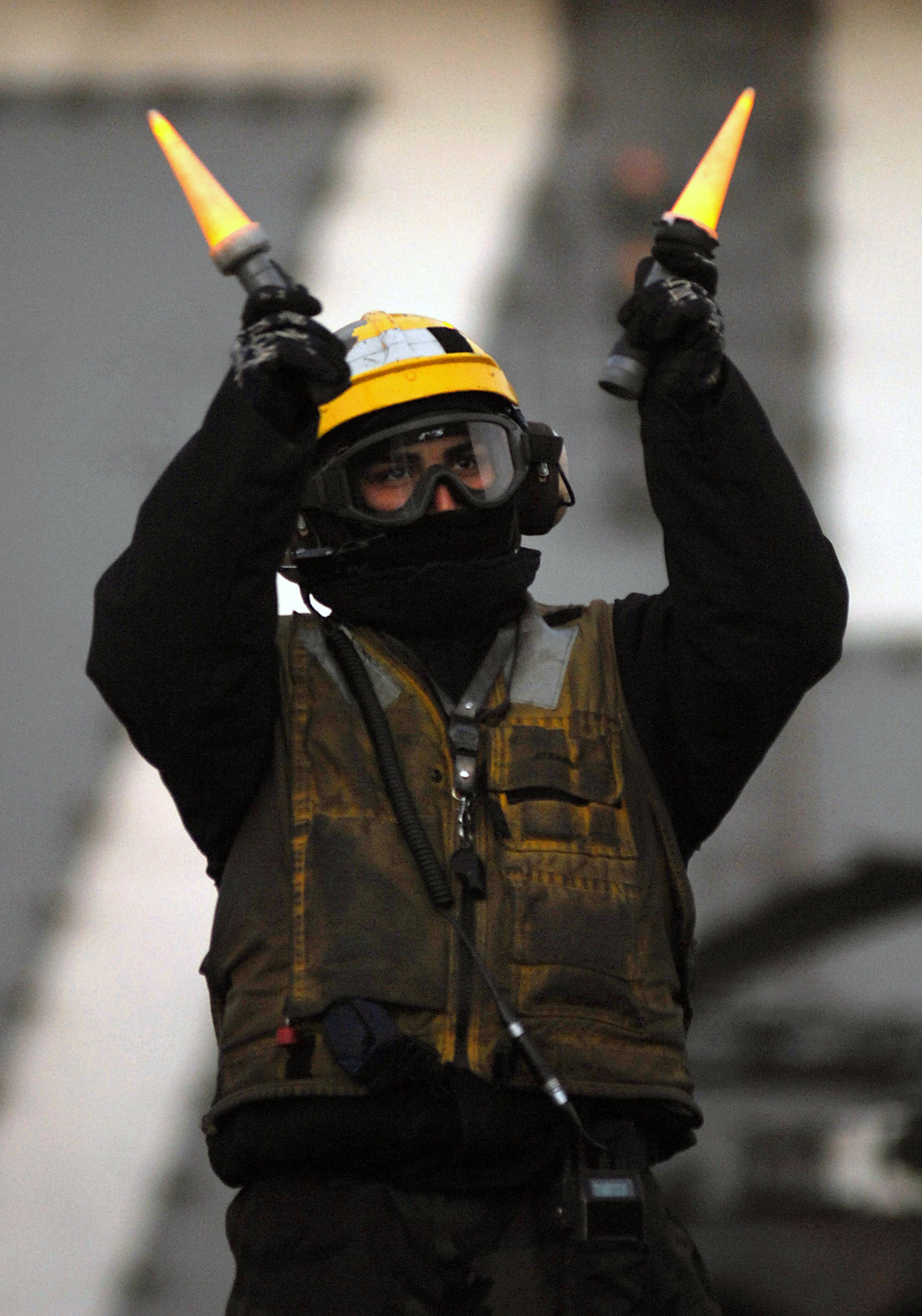
An aviation boatswain's mate taxies an aircraft during flight operations on USS Harry S. Truman

Aircraft directors, as their name implies, are responsible for directing all aircraft movement on the hangar and flight decks. They are enlisted aviation boatswain's mates. They are colloquially known as "bears" and those who work in the hangar go by the term "hangar rats". On some carriers, commissioned officers known as flight deck officers also serve as aircraft directors. During flight operations or during a flight deck "respot", typically about 12–15 yellowshirts are on the flight deck, and they report directly to the "handler". Although aircraft directors are often used at airports ashore, their function is particularly crucial in the confined flight deck environment where aircraft are routinely taxied within inches of one another, often with the ship rolling and pitching beneath. Directors wear yellow and use a complex set of hand signals (lighted yellow wands at night) to direct aircraft.

=== Landing signal officer ===
The landing signal officer (LSO) is a qualified, experienced pilot who is responsible for the visual control of aircraft in the terminal phase of the approach immediately prior to landing. LSOs ensure that approaching aircraft are properly configured, and they monitor aircraft glidepath angle, altitude, and lineup. They communicate with landing pilots by voice radio and light signals.

=== Arresting gear officer ===
The arresting gear officer is responsible for arresting gear operation, settings, and monitoring landing area deck status (the deck is either "clear" and ready to land aircraft or "foul" and not ready for landing). Arresting gear engines are set to apply varying resistance (weight setting) to the arresting cable based on the type of aircraft landing.

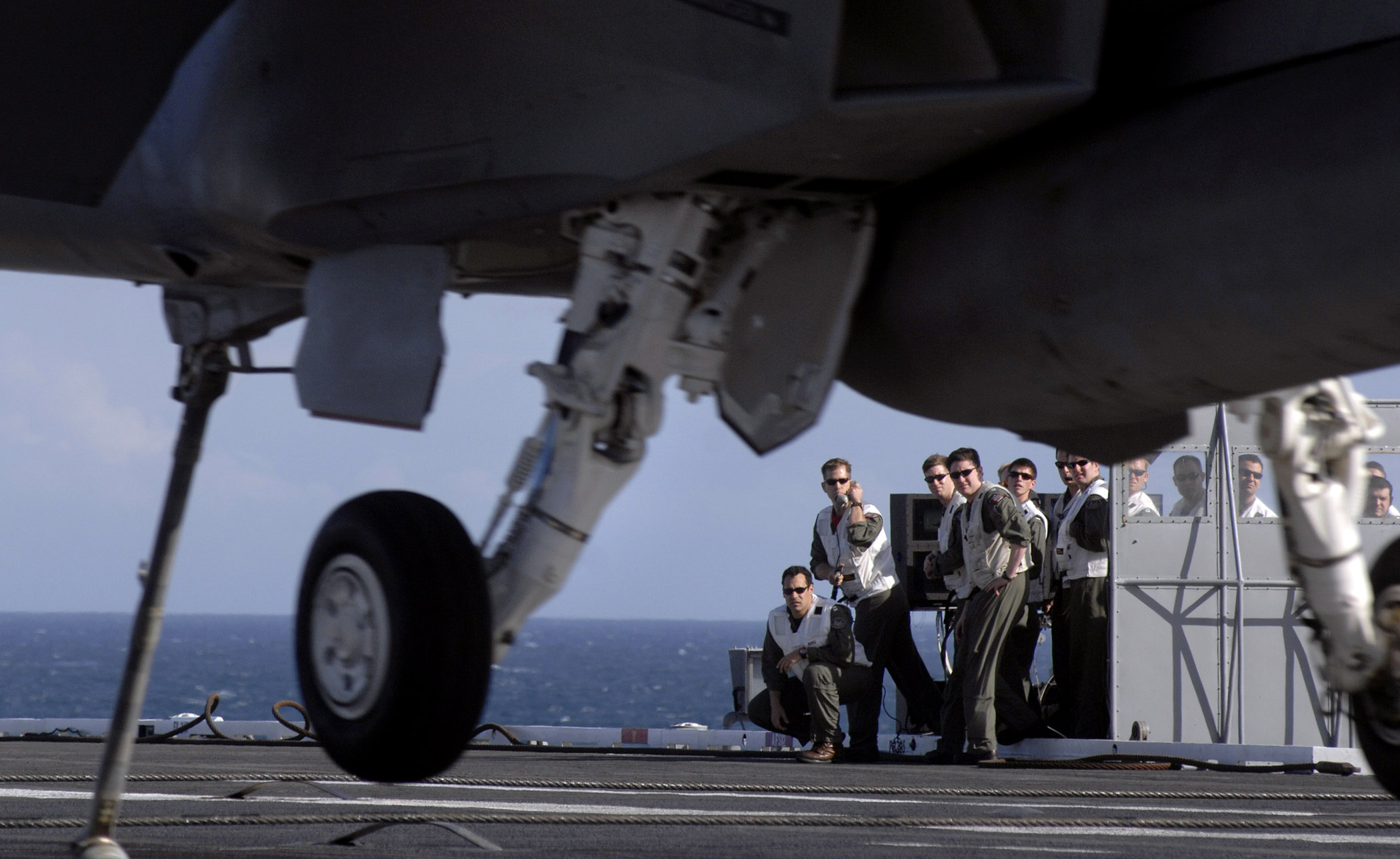
Landing Signal Officers

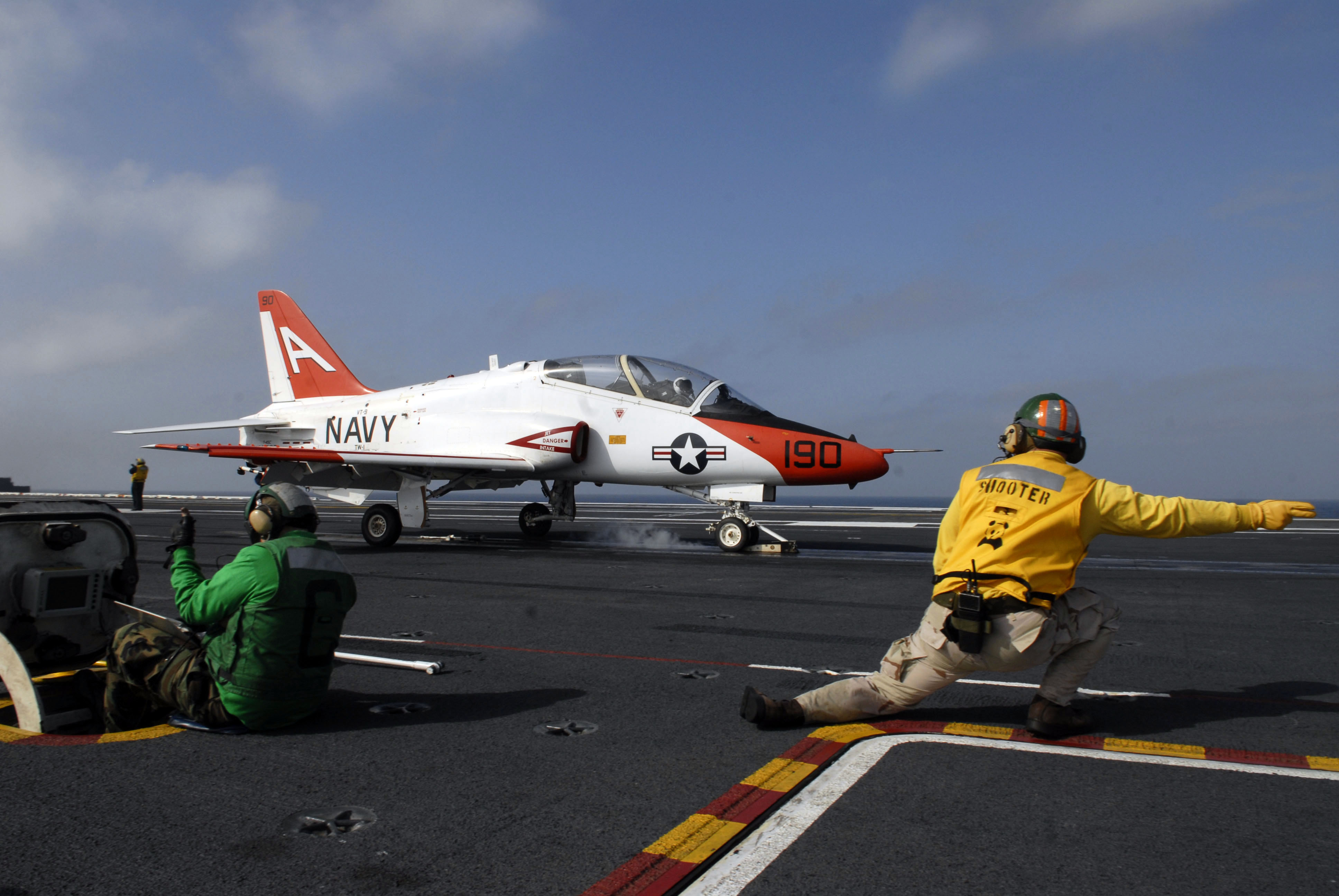
Catapult Crew

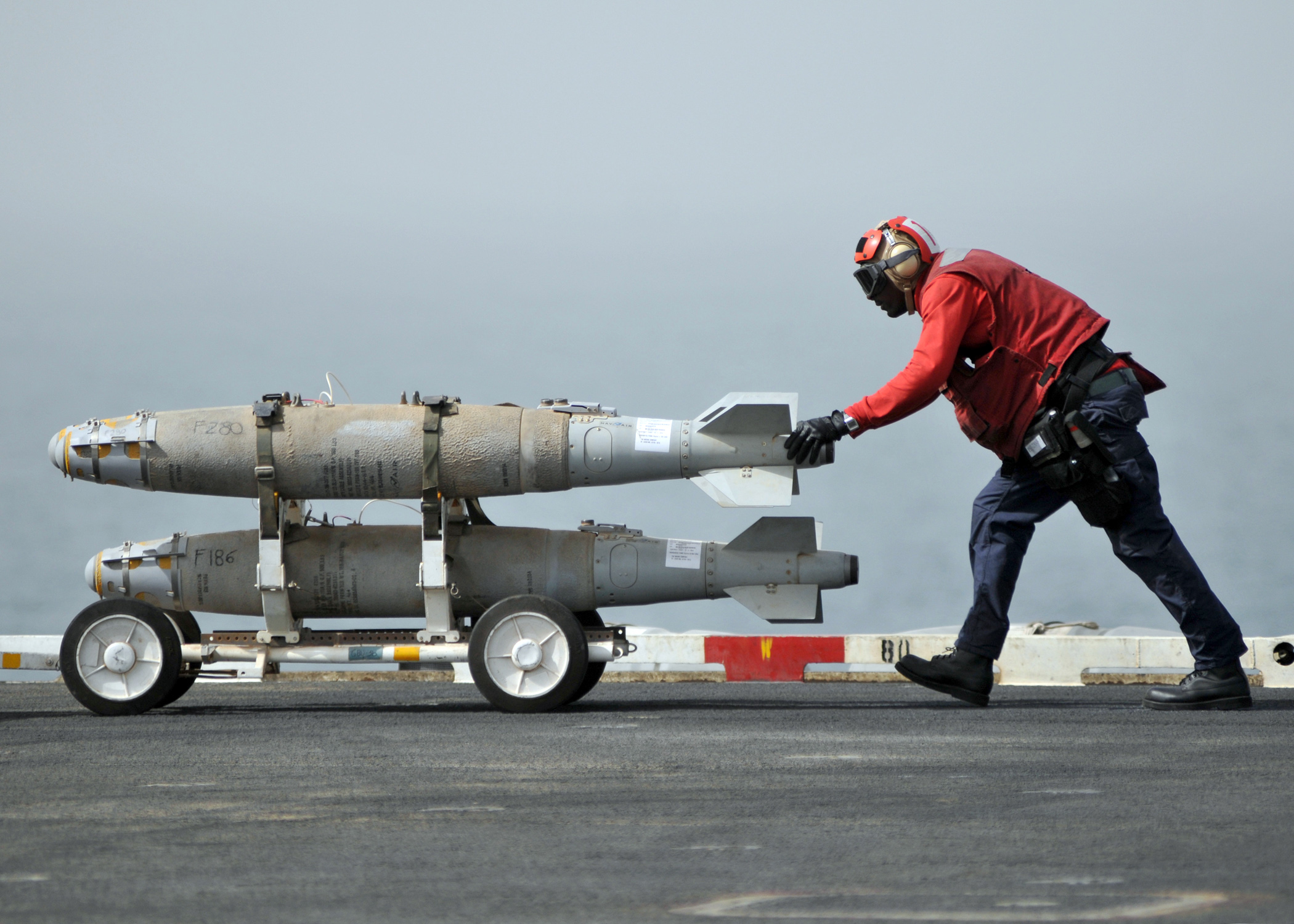
Ordnancemen

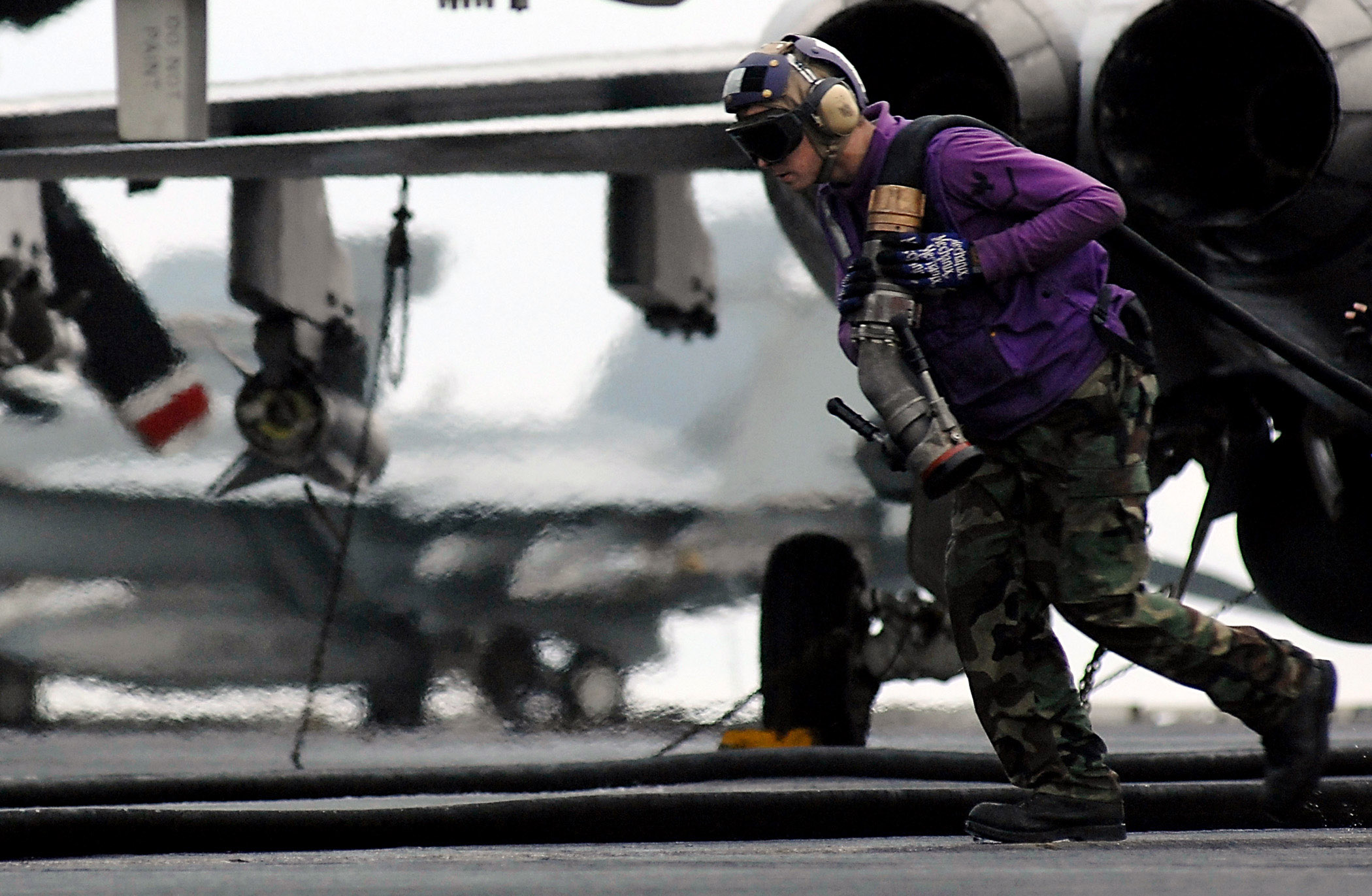
Aviation Fuel Handlers

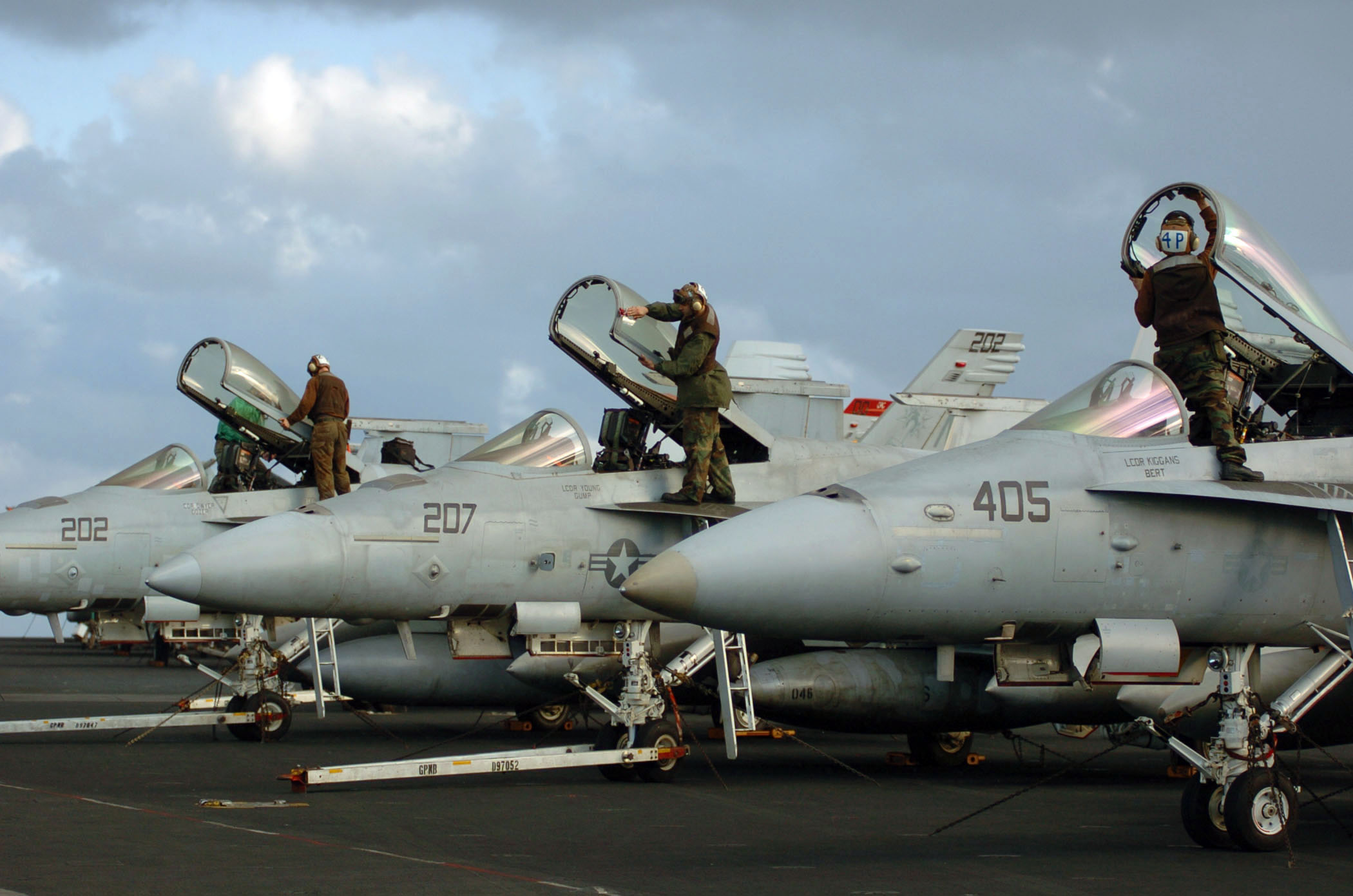
Plane Captains

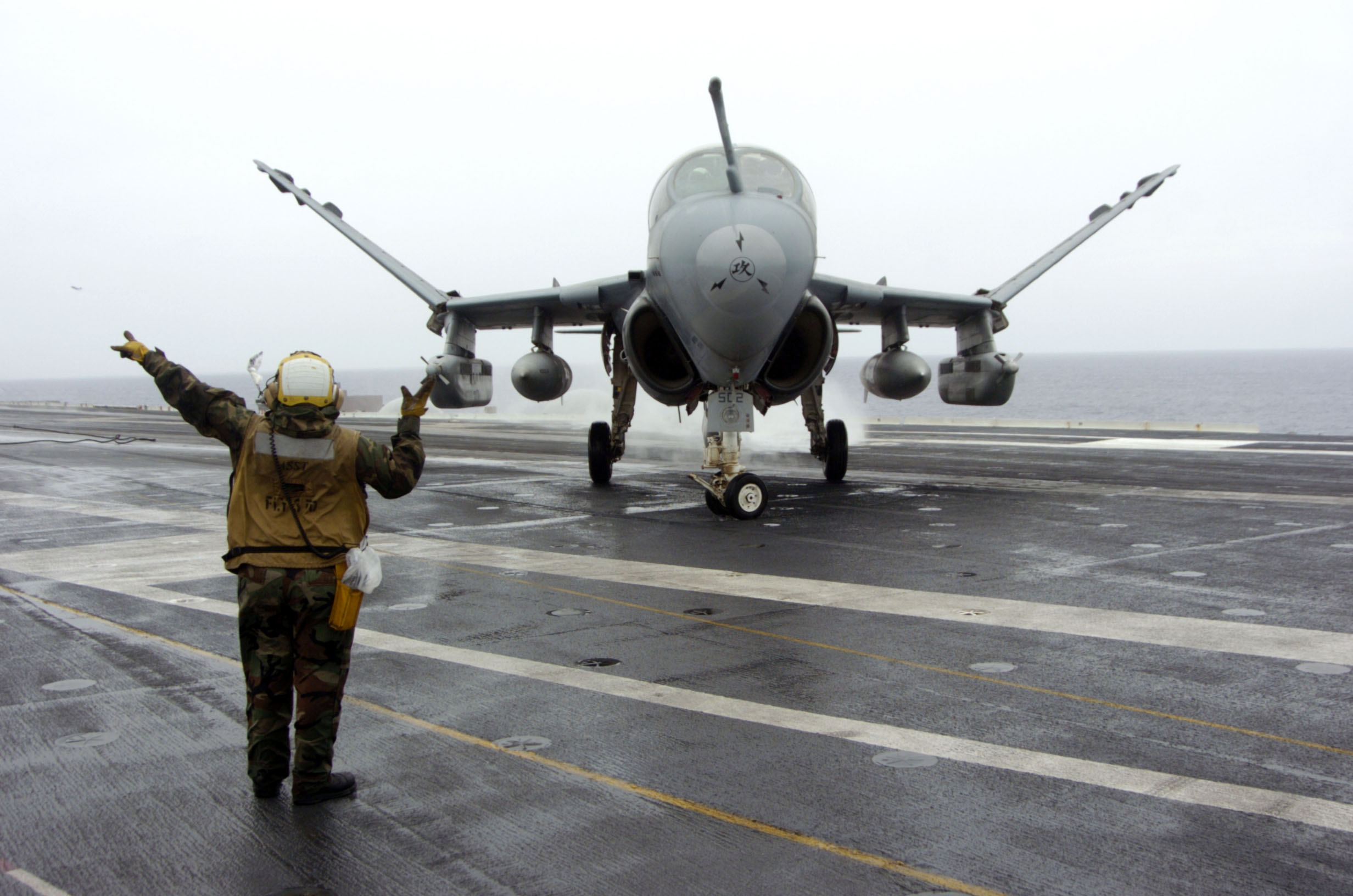
Plane Handlers

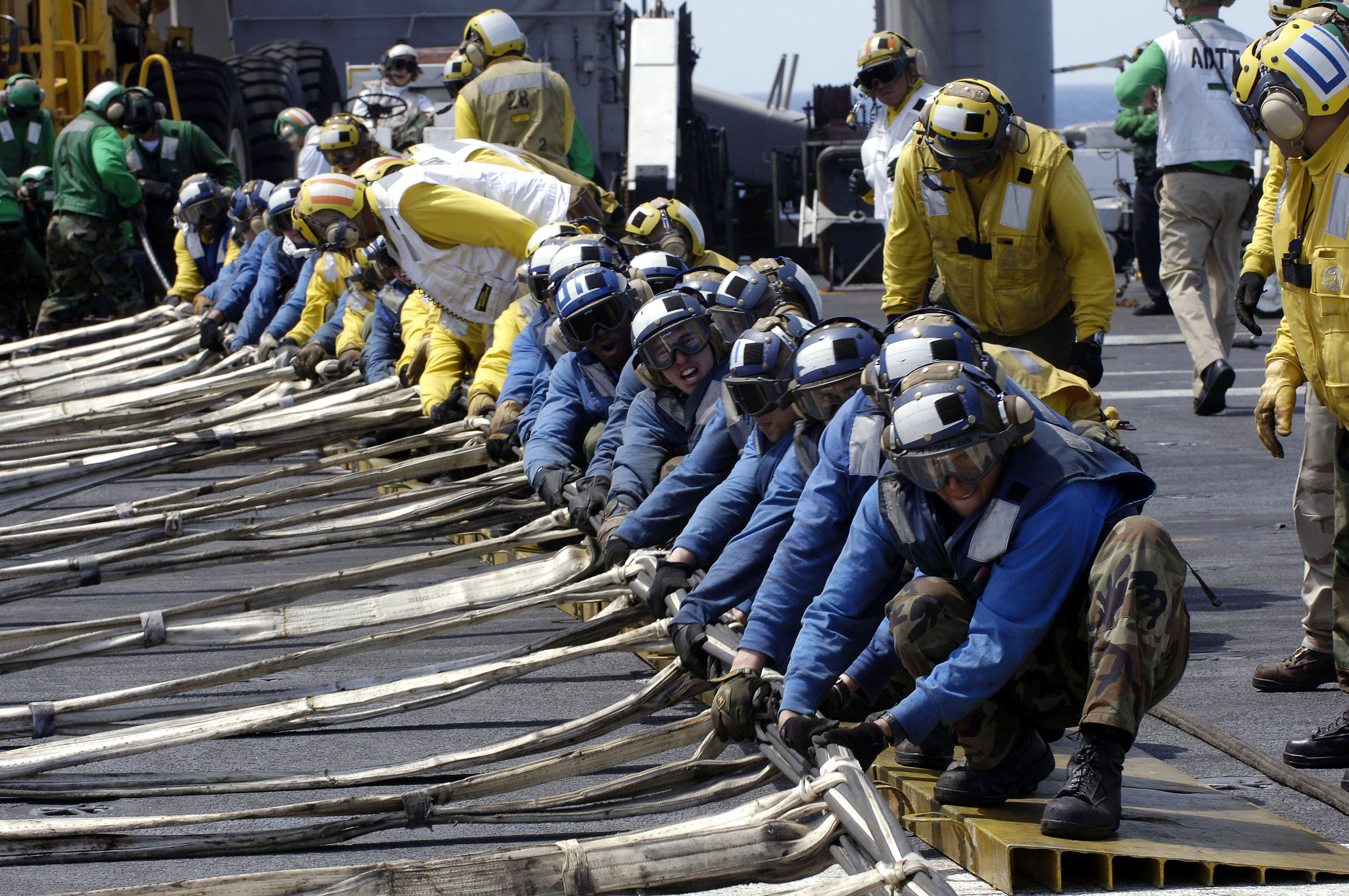
Flight Deck Crew

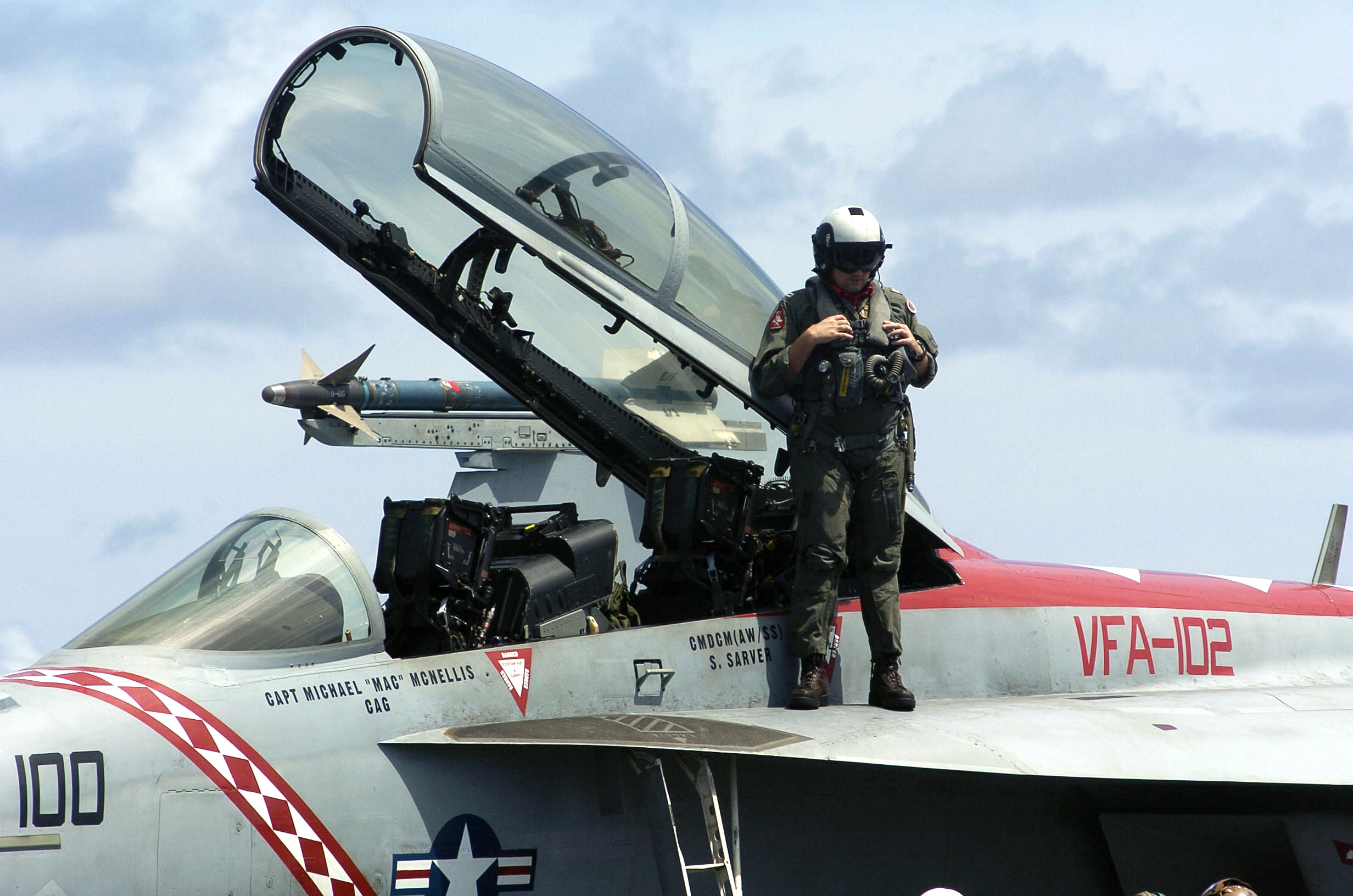
Aircrew

== Cyclic operations ==
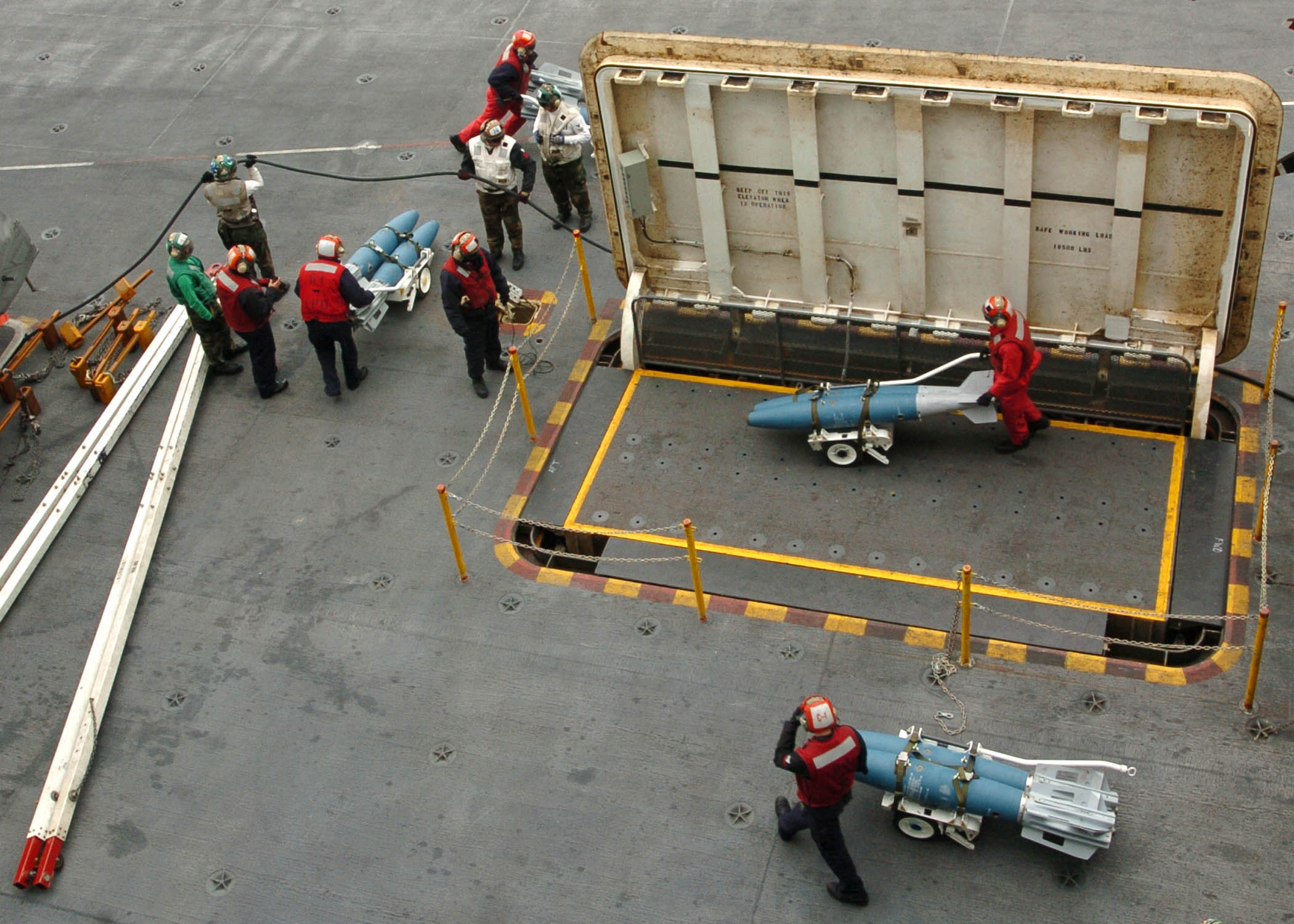
Ordnance is brought to the flight deck from the ship's magazines deep below decks

Cyclic operations refers to the launch and recovery cycle for aircraft in groups or "cycles". Launching and recovering aircraft aboard aircraft carriers is best accomplished nonconcurrently, and cyclic operations are the norm for U.S. aircraft carriers. Cycles are generally about one and a half hours long, although cycles as short as an hour or as long as an hour and 45 minutes are not uncommon. The shorter the cycle, the fewer aircraft can be launched/recovered; the longer the cycle, the more critical fuel becomes for airborne aircraft.

"Events" are typically made up of about 12–20 aircraft and are sequentially numbered throughout the 24-hour fly day. Prior to flight operations, the aircraft on the flight deck are arranged ("spotted") so that Event 1 aircraft can easily be taxied to the catapults once they have been started and inspected. Once the Event 1 aircraft are launched (which takes generally about 15 minutes), Event 2 aircraft are readied for launch about an hour later (based on the cycle time in use). The launching of all these aircraft makes room on the flight deck to then land aircraft. Once Event 2 aircraft are launched, Event 1 aircraft are recovered, fueled, rearmed, respotted, and readied to be used for Event 3. Event 3 aircraft are launched, followed by the recovery of Event 2 aircraft (and so on throughout the fly day). After the last recovery of the day, all of the aircraft are generally stored on the bow (because the landing area aft needs to be kept clear until the last aircraft lands). They are then respotted about the flight deck for the next morning's first launch.

== Classification of departure and recovery operations ==
Departure and recovery operations are classified according to meteorological conditions into Case I, Case II, or Case III.

- Case I occurs when flights are anticipated to not encounter instrument conditions (instrument meteorological conditions) during daytime departures/recoveries, and the ceiling and visibility around the carrier are no lower than 3,000 feet (910 m) and 5 nautical miles (9.3 km; 5.8 mi), respectively. Maintaining radio silence, or "zip lip", during case-I launches and recoveries is the norm, breaking radio silence only for safety-of-flight issues.
- Case II happens when flights may encounter instrument conditions during a daytime departure/recovery, and the ceiling or visibility in the carrier control zone are no lower than 1,000 feet (300 m) or 5 nautical miles (9.3 km; 5.8 mi), respectively. It is used for an overcast condition.
- Case III exists when flights are expected to encounter instrument conditions during a departure/recovery because the ceiling or visibility around the carrier is lower than 1,000 feet (300 m) and 5 nautical miles (9.3 km; 5.8 mi), respectively, or for night departures/recoveries.

== Launch operations ==
=== Before launch ===
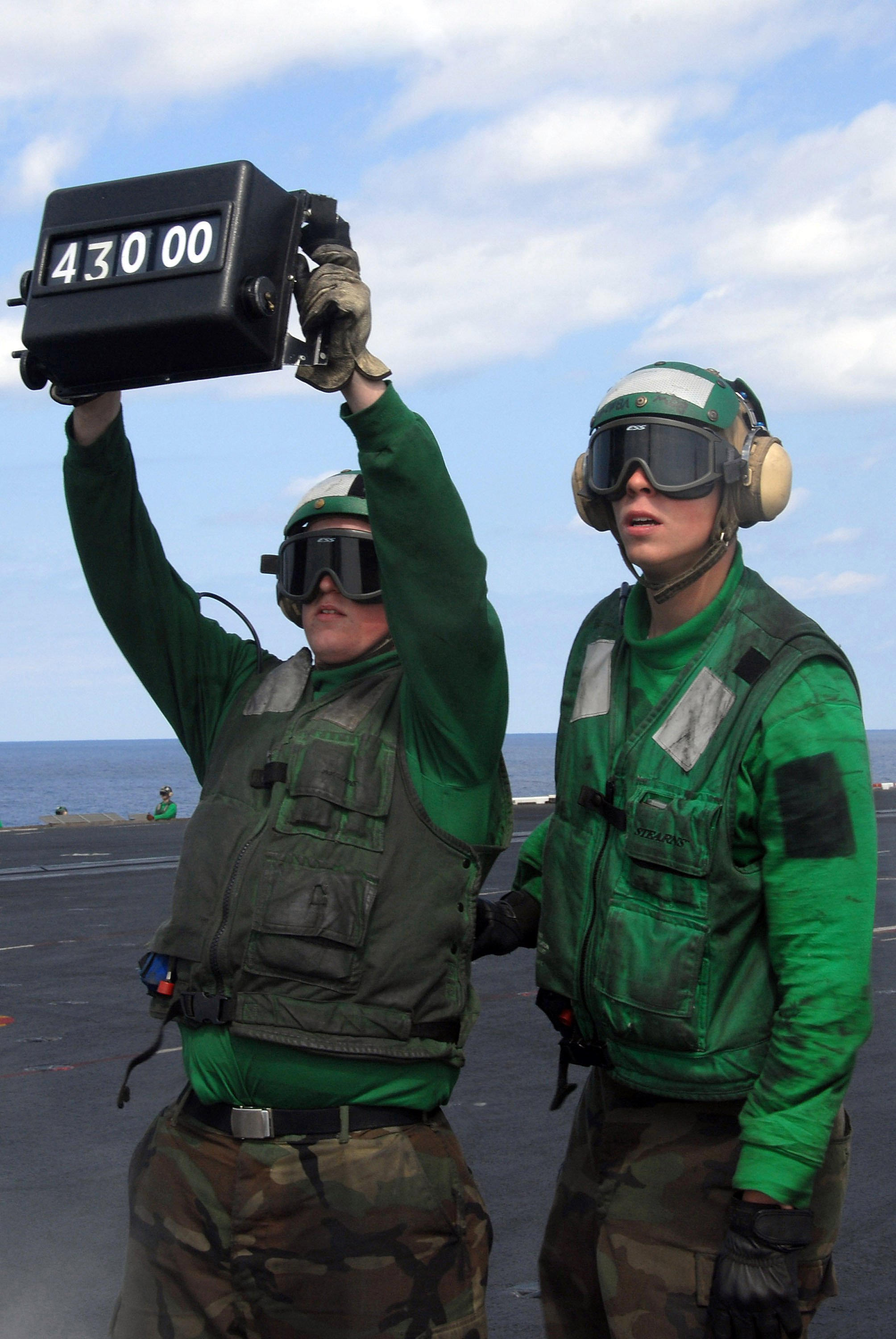
Catapult personnel verify aircraft weight with the pilot prior to launch

About 45 minutes before launch time, flight crews conduct walk-arounds and man assigned aircraft. Around 30 minutes prior to launch, preflight checks are conducted and aircraft engines are started. Roughly 15 minutes prior to launch, ready aircraft are taxied from their parked positions and spotted on or immediately behind the catapults. To assist the launch, the ship is turned into the natural wind. As an aircraft is taxied onto the catapult, the wings are spread and a large jet blast deflector panel rises out of the flight deck behind the engine exhaust. Prior to final catapult hookup, final checkers (inspectors) make final exterior checks of the aircraft, and loaded weapons are armed by ordnancemen.

=== Catapult launch ===
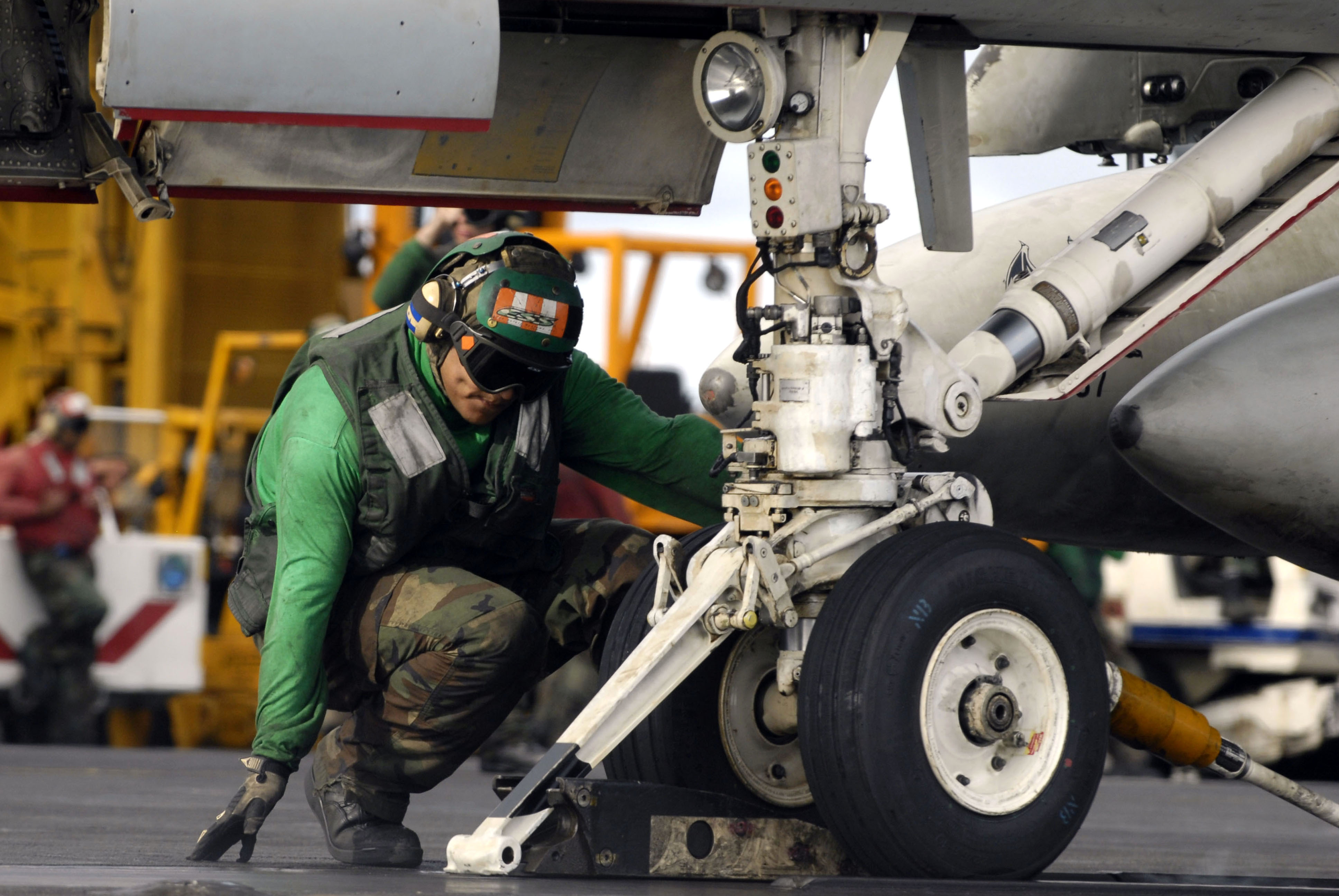
"Hookup Man" ensures that aircraft launchbar (left) and holdback fitting (right) are properly seated in the catapult.

Catapult hook up is accomplished by placing the aircraft launch bar, which is attached to the front of the aircraft's nose landing gear, into the catapult shuttle (which is attached to the catapult gear under the flight deck). An additional bar, the holdback, is connected from the rear of the nose landing gear to the carrier deck. The holdback bar keeps the aircraft from moving forward prior to catapult firing ensuring a launch does not occur unless steam pressure has exceeded the preset load setting of the aircraft specific holdback. In final preparation for launch, a series of events happens in rapid succession, indicated by hand/light signals:

- The catapult is put into tension whereby all the slack is taken out of the system with hydraulic pressure on the rear of the shuttle.
- The pilot is then signaled to advance the throttles to full (or "military") power, and they take their feet off the brakes.
- The pilot checks engine instruments and "wipes out" (moves) all the control surfaces.
- The pilot indicates that they are satisfied that their aircraft is ready for flight by saluting the catapult officer. At night, they turn on the aircraft's exterior lights to indicate they are ready.
- During this time, two or more final checkers are observing the exterior of the aircraft for proper flight control movement, engine response, panel security, and leaks.
- Once satisfied, the checkers give a thumbs up to the catapult officer.
- The catapult officer makes a final check of catapult settings, wind, etc. and gives the signal to launch.
- The catapult operator then pushes a button to fire the catapult.

Once the catapult fires, the hold-back breaks free as the shuttle moves rapidly forward, dragging the aircraft by the launch bar. The aircraft accelerates from zero (relative to the carrier deck) to about 150 knots (280 km/h; 170 mph) in about 2 seconds. Typically wind (natural or ship motion generated) is blowing over the flight deck, giving the aircraft additional lift.

=== After launch ===
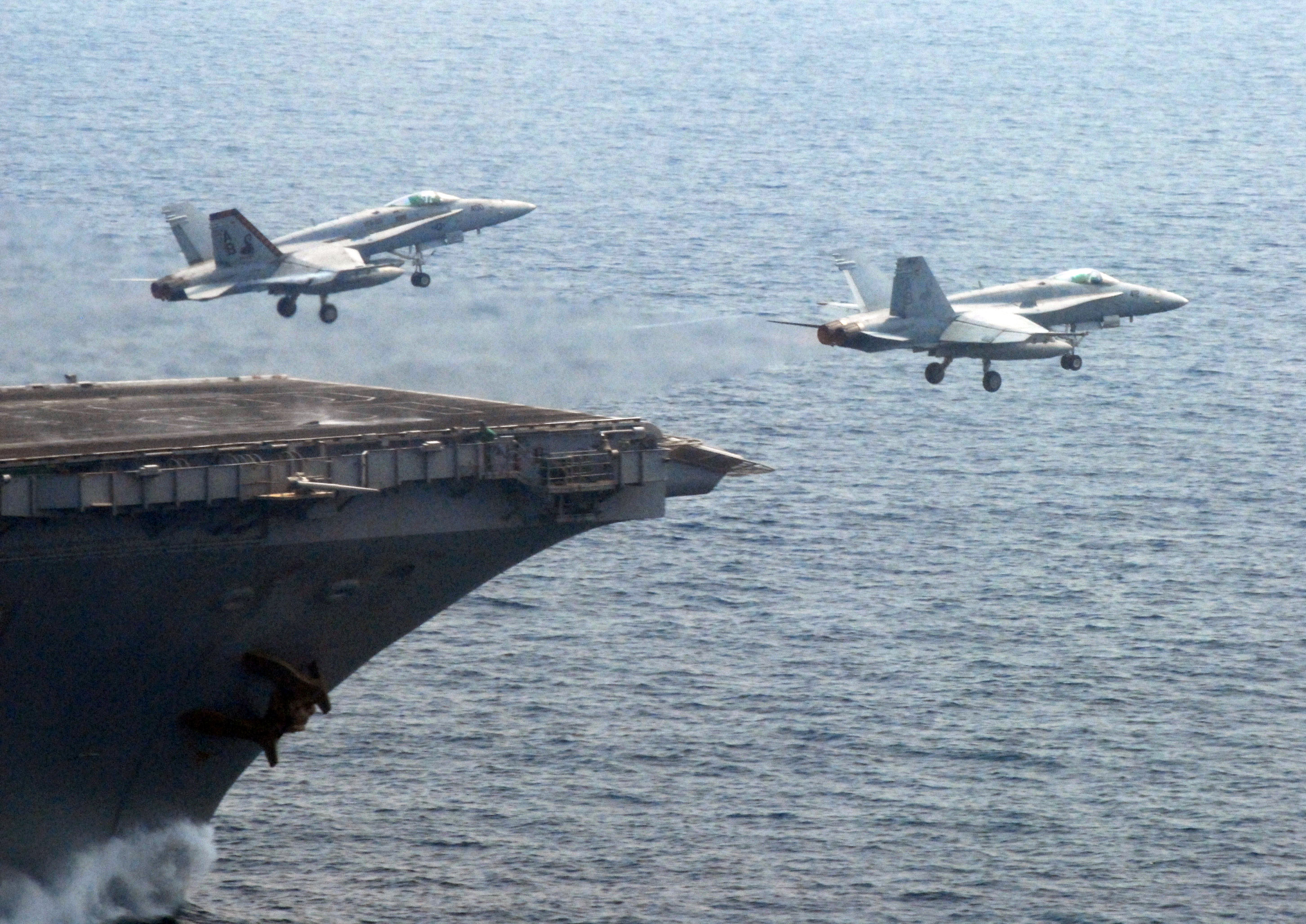
Simultaneous Case I launch

Procedures used after launch are based on meteorological and environmental conditions. Primary responsibility for adherence to the departure rests with the pilot. However, advisory control is given by the ship's departure control radar operators, including when dictated by weather conditions.

- In Case I launches, immediately after becoming airborne, aircraft raise their landing gear and perform "clearing turns" to the right off the bow and to the left off the waist catapults. This roughly 10° check turn is made to increase separation of (nearly) simultaneously launched aircraft from the waist/bow catapults. After the clearing turn, aircraft proceed straight ahead paralleling the ship's course at 500 feet (150 m) until 7 nautical miles (13 km; 8.1 mi). Aircraft are then cleared to climb unrestricted in visual conditions.
- In Case II launches, after a clearing turn, aircraft proceed straight ahead at 500 feet, paralleling ship's course. At 7 nautical miles (13 km; 8.1 mi), aircraft turn to intercept a 10-nautical-mile (19 km; 12 mi) arc about the ship, maintaining visual conditions until established outbound on their assigned departure radial, at which time they are free to climb through the weather. The 500-foot (150 m) restriction is lifted after 7 nmi if the climb can be continued in visual conditions.
- In Case III launches, a minimum launch interval of 30 seconds is used between aircraft, which climb straight ahead. At 7 nautical miles (13 km; 8.1 mi), they turn to fly the 10-nmi arc until intercepting their assigned departure radial.

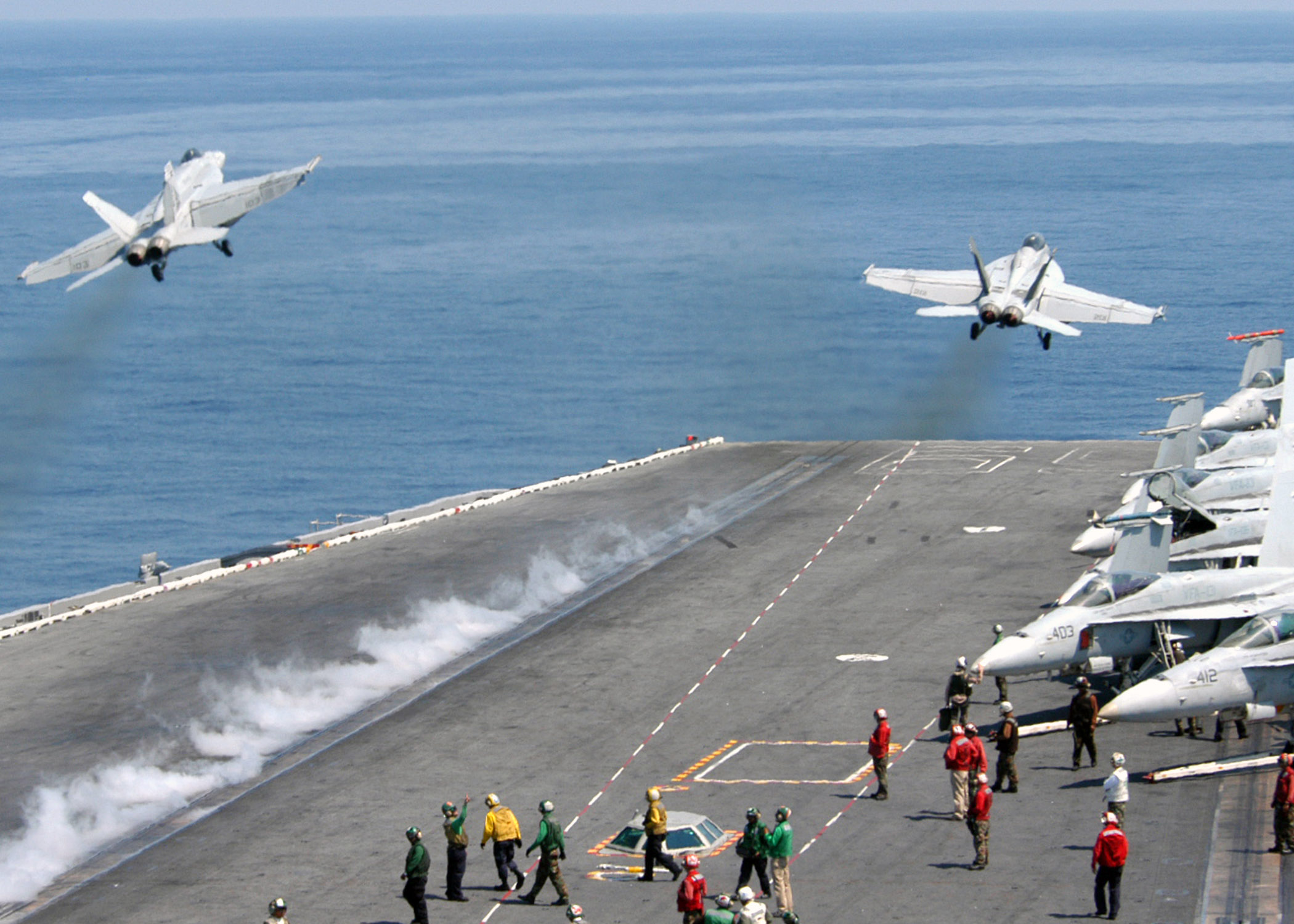
A "clearing turn" is performed for case I/II launches.

Aircraft are often launched from the carrier in a somewhat random order based on their deck positioning prior to launch. Therefore, aircraft working together on the same mission must rendezvous airborne. This is accomplished at a predetermined location, usually at the in-flight refueling tanker, overhead the carrier, or at an en route location. Properly equipped F/A-18E/F Super Hornets provide "organic" refueling, or U.S. Air Force (or other nations') tankers provide "nonorganic" tanking. After rendezvous/tanking, aircraft proceed on mission.

== Recovery operations ==
All aircraft within the carrier's radar coverage (typically several hundred miles) are tracked and monitored. As aircraft enter the carrier control area, a 50-nautical-mile radius (93 km; 58 mi) around the carrier, they are given more scrutiny. Once airwing aircraft have been identified, they are normally turned over to marshal control for further clearance to the marshal pattern.

As with departures, the type of recovery is based on the meteorological conditions:

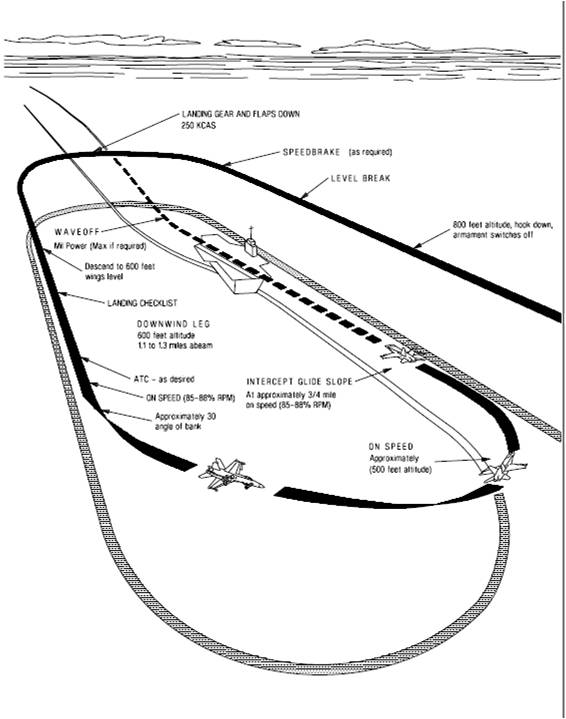
NATOPS manual graphic of day case I overhead landing pattern

- Case I is for aircraft awaiting recovery in the port holding pattern, a left-hand circle tangent to the ship's course with the ship in the 3-o'clock position, and a maximum diameter of 5 nautical miles (9.3 km; 5.8 mi). Aircraft typically hold in close formations of two or more and are stacked at various altitudes based on their type/squadron. Minimum holding altitude is 2,000 feet (610 m), with a minimum of 1,000 feet (300 m) vertical separation between holding altitudes. Pilots arrange themselves to establish proper separation for landing. As the launching aircraft (from the subsequent event) clear the flight deck and landing area becomes clear, the lowest aircraft in holding descend and depart the stack in final preparation for landing. Higher aircraft descend in the stack to altitudes vacated by lower holding aircraft. The final descent from the bottom of the stack is planned so as to arrive at the "initial" which is 3 nautical miles (5.6 km; 3.5 mi) astern the ship at 800 feet (240 m), paralleling the ship's course. The aircraft are then flown over the ship and "break" into the landing pattern, ideally establishing at 50- to 60-second intervals on the aircraft in front of them.

If too many (more than six) aircraft are in the landing pattern when a flight arrives at the ship, the flight leader initiates a "spin", climbing up slightly and executing a tight 360° turn within 3 nautical miles (5.6 km; 3.5 mi) of the ship.

The break is a level, 180° turn made at 800 feet (240 m), descending to 600 feet (180 m) when established downwind. Landing gear/flaps are lowered, and landing checks are completed. When abeam (directly aligned with) the landing area on downwind, the aircraft is 180° from the ship's course and about 1.1 nautical miles (2.0 km; 1.3 mi) to 1.3 nautical miles (2.4 km; 1.5 mi) from the ship, a position known as "the 180" (because of the angled flight deck, which is actually closer to 190° of turn required at this point). The pilot begins his turn to final while simultaneously beginning a gentle descent. At "the 90" the aircraft is at 450 feet (140 m), about 1.2 nautical miles (2.2 km; 1.4 mi) from the ship, with 90° of turn to go. The final checkpoint for the pilot is crossing the ship's wake, at which time the aircraft should be approaching final landing heading and around 370 feet (110 m). At this point, the pilot acquires the optical landing system, which is used for the terminal portion of the landing. During this time, the pilot's full attention is devoted to maintaining proper glideslope, lineup, and angle of attack until touchdown.

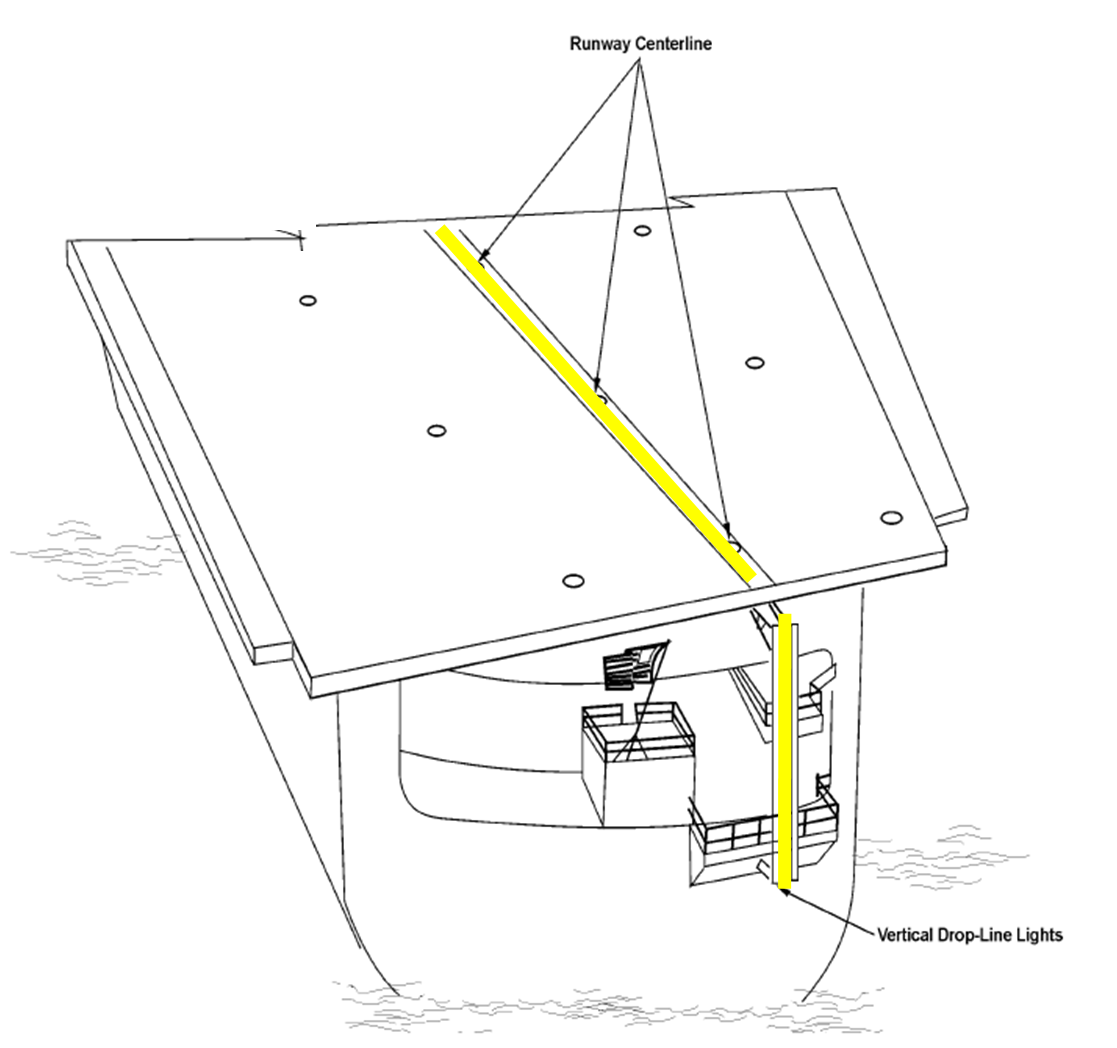
A drop line runs vertically from the flight deck down to near the waterline on the stern of the ship. In this graphic, the viewer is left of centerline

Line up on landing area centerline is critical because it is only 120 feet (37 m) in width, and aircraft are often parked within a few feet of either side. This is accomplished visually during case I using the painted "ladder lines" on the sides of the landing area and the centerline/drop line (see graphic).

- Case-II approaches are used when weather conditions are such that the flight may encounter instrument conditions during the descent, but visual conditions of at least 1,000 feet (300 m) ceiling and 5 nautical miles (9.3 km; 5.8 mi) visibility exist at the ship. Positive radar control is used until the pilot is inside 10 nautical miles (19 km; 12 mi) and reports the ship in sight.

Flight leaders follow case-III approach procedures outside 10 nautical miles (19 km; 12 mi). When within 10 nmi with the ship in sight, flights are shifted to tower control and proceed as in case I.

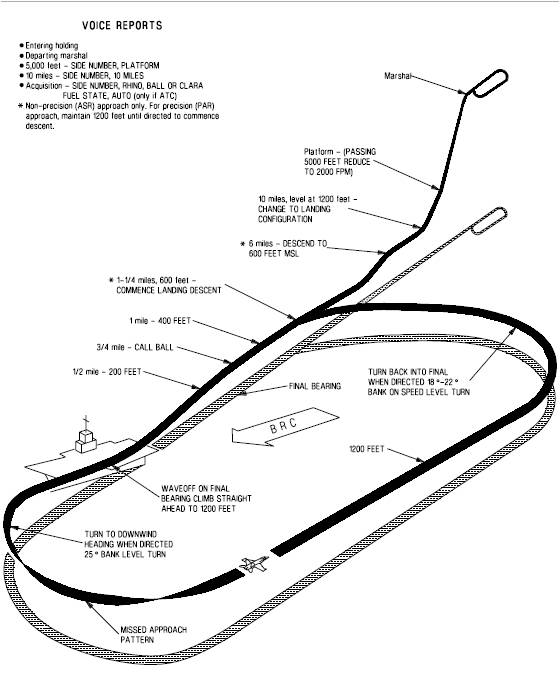
A case-III approach is used during instrument flight rules.

- The case-III approach is used whenever existing weather at the ship is below case-II minima and during all night-flight operations. Case-III recoveries are made with single aircraft, with no formations except in an emergency situation.

All aircraft are assigned holding at a marshal fix, typically about 150° from the ship's base recovery course, at a unique distance and altitude. The holding pattern is a left-handed, 6-minute (oval) racetrack pattern. Each pilot adjusts his holding pattern to depart marshal precisely at the assigned time. Aircraft departing marshal normally are separated by 1 minute. Adjustments may be directed by the ship's carrier air traffic control center, if required, to ensure proper separation. To maintain proper separation of aircraft, parameters must be precisely flown. Aircraft descend at 250 knots (460 km/h; 290 mph) and 4,000 feet per minute (1,200 m/min) until an elevation of 5,000 feet (1,500 m) is reached, when the descent is lessened to 2,000 feet per minute (610 m/min). Aircraft transition to a landing configuration (wheels/flaps down) at 10 nmi from the ship. If the stack is held more than 10° away from the final bearing (approach course to the ship), then at 12.5 nautical miles (23.2 km; 14.4 mi), the pilot will arc at 250 knots (460 km/h; 290 mph), and then intercept that final bearing, to proceed with the approach.

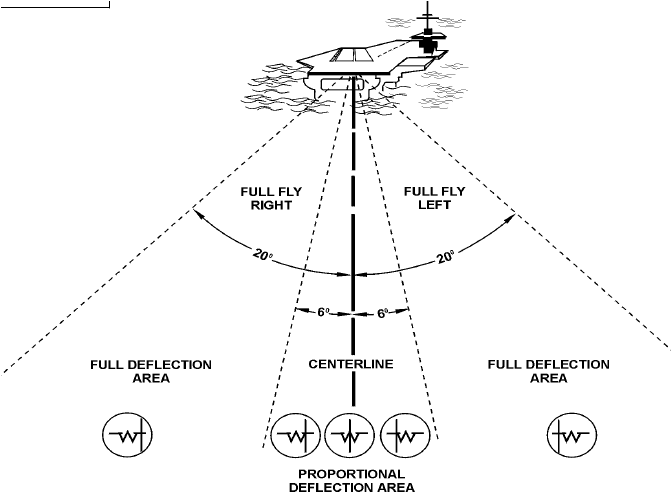
Correcting to the final bearing using an ILS, ACLS, LRLU, or carrier-controlled approach

Since the landing area is angled about 10° from the axis of the ship, aircraft final approach heading (final bearing) is about 10° less than the ship's heading (base recovery course). Aircraft on the standard approach without an arc (called the CV-1) still have to correct from the marshal radial to the final bearing, and this is done in such case, at 20 nautical miles (37 km; 23 mi). As the ship moves through the water, the aircraft must make continual, minor corrections to the right to stay on the final bearing. If the ship makes course correction–which is often done to make the relative wind (natural wind plus ship's movement generated wind) go directly down the angle deck, or to avoid obstacles–lineup to center line must be corrected. The further the aircraft is from the ship, the larger the correction required.

Aircraft pass through the 6-nautical-mile (11 km; 6.9 mi) fix at 1,200 feet (370 m) altitude, 150 knots (280 km/h; 170 mph), in the landing configuration and commence slowing to final approach speed. At 3 nautical miles (5.6 km; 3.5 mi), aircraft begin a gradual (700-foot-per-minute (210 m/min) or 3–4°) descent until touchdown. To arrive precisely in position to complete the landing visually (at 3/4 nautical mile (1.4 km; 0.86 mi) behind the ship at 400 feet (120 m)), several instrument systems/procedures are used. Once the pilot acquires visual contact with the optical landing aids, the pilot will "call the ball". Control will then be assumed by the LSO, who issues final landing clearance with a "roger ball" call. When other systems are not available, aircraft on final approach continue their descent using distance/altitude checkpoints (e.g., 1,200 feet (370 m) at 3 nautical miles (5.6 km; 3.5 mi), 860 feet (260 m) at 2 nautical miles (3.7 km; 2.3 mi), 460 feet (140 m) at 1 nautical mile (1.9 km; 1.2 mi), 360 feet (110 m) at the "ball" call).

=== Approach ===
The carrier-controlled approach is analogous to ground-controlled approach using the ship's precision approach radar. Pilots are told (by voice radio) where they are in relation to glideslope and final bearing (e.g., "above glideslope, right of centerline"). The pilot then makes a correction and awaits further information from the controller.

The instrument carrier landing system (ICLS) is very similar to civilian instrument landing systems, and is used on virtually all case-III approaches. A "bullseye" is displayed for the pilot, indicating aircraft position in relation to glideslope and final bearing. The automatic carrier landing system is similar to the ICLS, in that it displays "needles" that indicate aircraft position in relation to glideslope and final bearing. An approach using this system is said to be a "mode II" approach. Additionally, some aircraft are capable of "coupling" their autopilots to the glideslope/azimuth signals received via data link from the ship, allowing for a "hands-off" approach. If the pilot keeps the autopilot coupled until touchdown, this is referred to as a "mode I" approach. If the pilot maintains a couple until the visual approach point (at 3/4 nautical mile (1.4 km; 0.86 mi)) this is referred to as a "mode IA" approach.

The long-range laser lineup system (LLS) uses eye-safe lasers, projected aft of the ship, to give pilots a visual indication of their lineup with relation to centerline. The LLS is typically used from as much as 10 nmi until the landing area can be seen around 1 nautical mile (1.9 km; 1.2 mi).

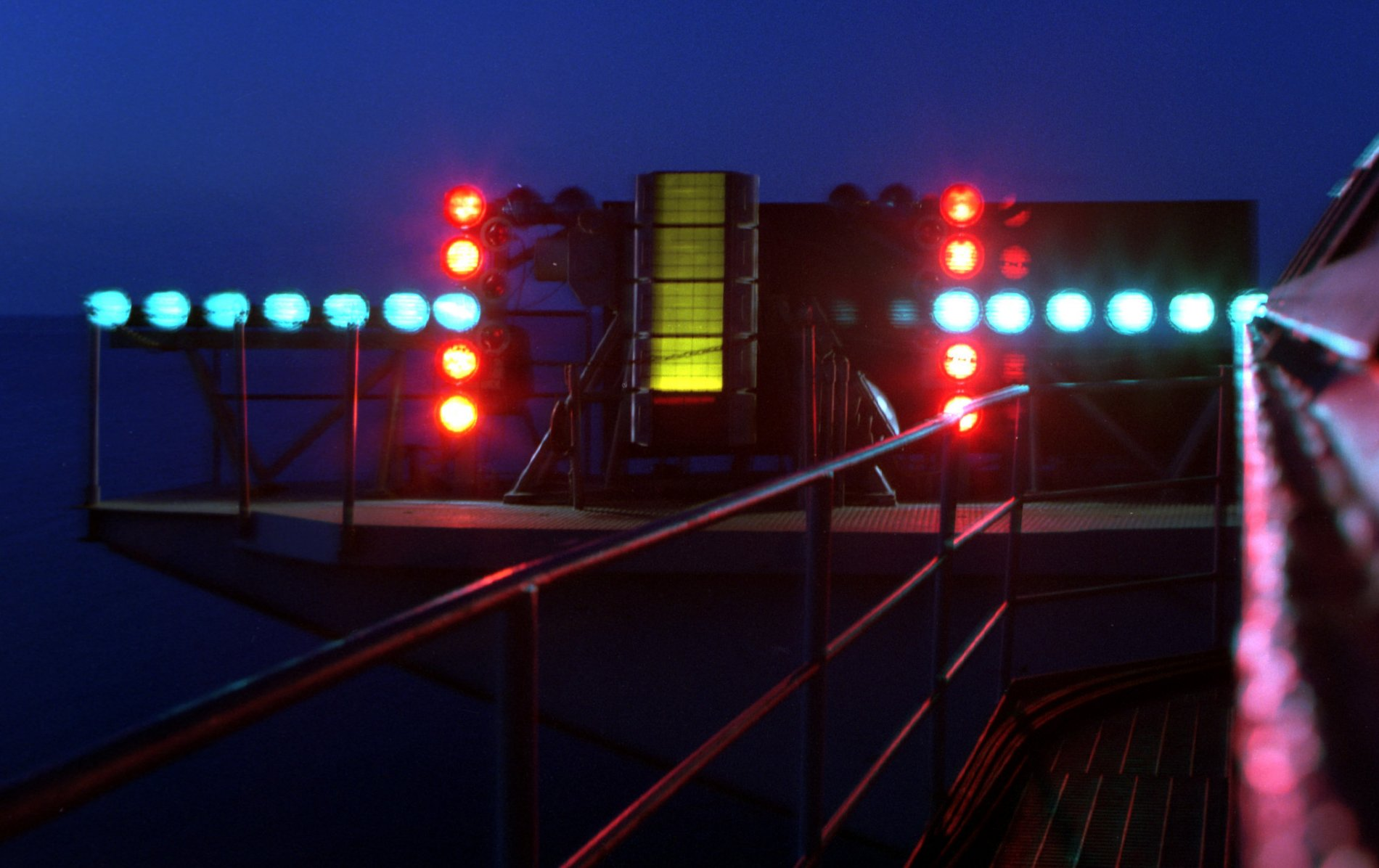
Fresnel lens optical landing system aboard USS Dwight D. Eisenhower

Regardless of the case recovery or approach type, the final portion of the landing (3/4 nautical mile (1.4 km; 0.86 mi) to touchdown) is flown visually. Line-up with the landing area is achieved by lining up painted lines on the landing area centerline with a set of lights that drops from the back of the flight deck. Proper glideslope is maintained using an optical landing system ("meatball"), either the Fresnel lens optical landing system (FLOLS), improved FLOLS, or a manually operated OLS.

If an aircraft is pulled off the approach (the landing area is not clear, for example) or is waved off by the LSO (for poor parameters or a fouled deck), or misses all the arresting wires ("bolters"), the pilot climbs straight ahead to 1,200 feet (370 m) to the "bolter/wave-off pattern" and waits for instructions from approach control.

=== Landing ===
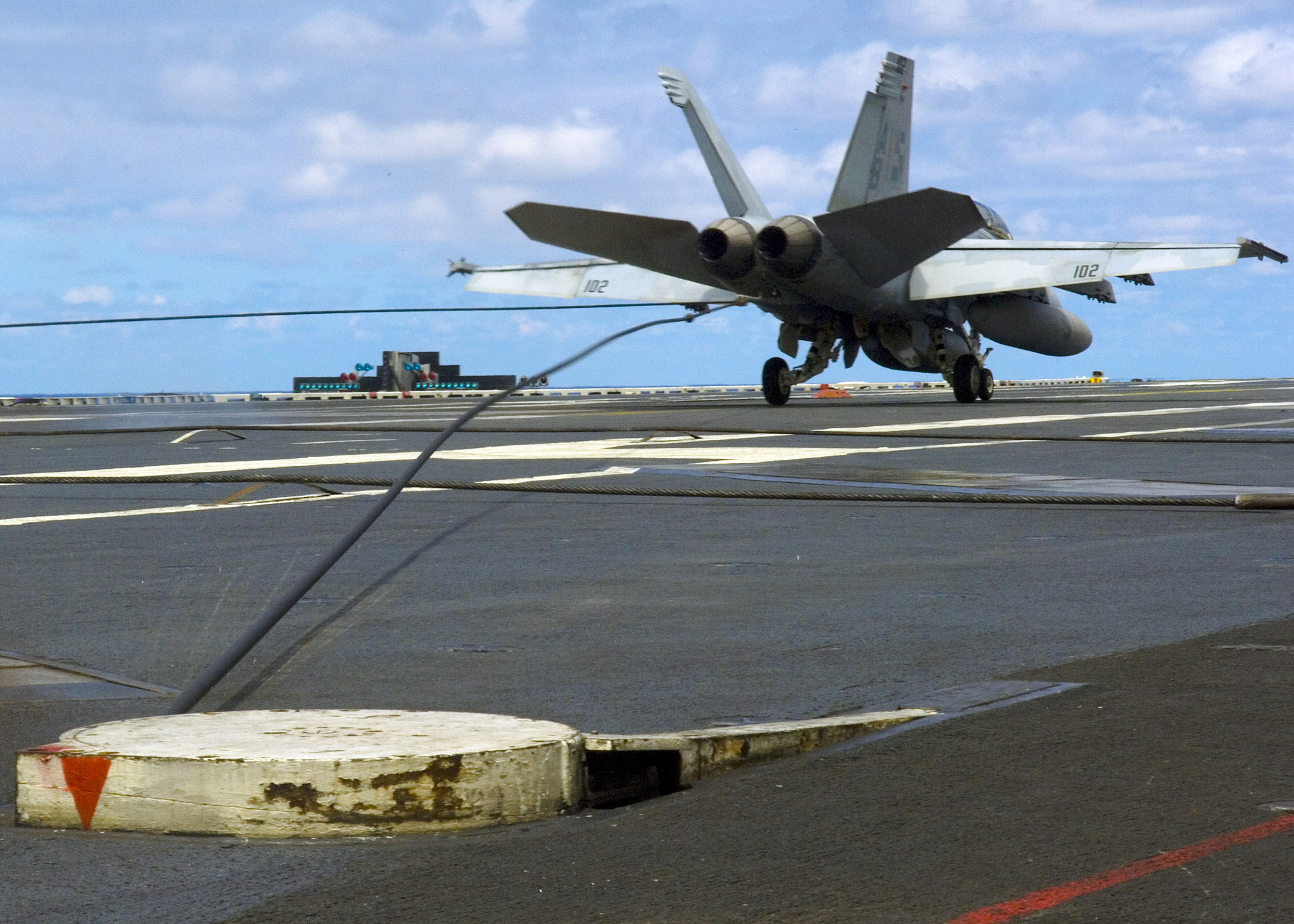
An F/A-18 makes an arrested landing

The pilot aims for the middle arresting wire, which is either the second or third depending on the configuration of the carrier. Upon touchdown, the throttles are advanced to military/full power for three seconds. This is done to keep the engines spooled and providing thrust in case a bolter (missing every wire, go-around) occurs or even for the unlikely event of a cable snapping. Afterwards, the throttles are reduced to idle, and the hook is raised on the aircraft director's signal. Ideally, the tailhook catches the target wire (or cross deck pendant), which abruptly slows the aircraft from approach speed to a full stop in about two seconds.

After landing, aircraft are packed on the bow to keep the landing area clear

The aircraft director then directs the aircraft to clear the landing area in preparation for the next landing. Remaining ordnance is disarmed, wings are folded, and aircraft are taxied to parking spots and shut down. Immediately upon shutdown (or sometimes prior to that), the aircraft are refueled, rearmed, and inspected; minor maintenance is performed; and often respotted prior to the next launch cycle.

== Carrier qualifications ==
The purpose of carrier qualifications (CQ) is to give pilots a dedicated opportunity to develop fundamental skills associated with operating fixed-wing, carrier-based aircraft and demonstrate acceptable levels of proficiency required for qualification. During CQ, typically far fewer aircraft are on the flight deck than during cyclic operations. This allows for much easier simultaneous launch and recovery of aircraft. The waist catapults (located in the landing area) are generally not used. Aircraft can trap and be taxied immediately to a bow catapult for launch.

=== Types and requirements ===
CQ is performed for new pilots and periodically for experienced pilots to gain/maintain carrier landing currency. Requirements (the number of landings/touch-and-goes required) are based on the experience of the pilot and the length of time since his last arrested landing. Civilian pilots can receive qualification; CIA pilots did so with the Lockheed U-2 in 1964.

- Undergraduate CQ is for student naval aviators, currently completed in the T-45 Goshawk and consisting of 14 day landings (10 arrested; up to four can be "touch-and-go").
- Initial CQ is flown in a newly designated aviator's first fleet aircraft (F/A-18, EA-18G, or E-2/C-2A), consisting of 12 day (minimum 10 arrested) and eight night landings (minimum 6 arrested).
- Transition CQ is for experienced pilots transitioning from one type of aircraft to another, consisting of 12 day landings (minimum 10 arrested) and six night arrested landings.
- Requalification CQ is for experienced pilots who have not flown from the carrier within the previous six months, consisting of six day arrested landings and four night arrested landings.

== Gallery ==
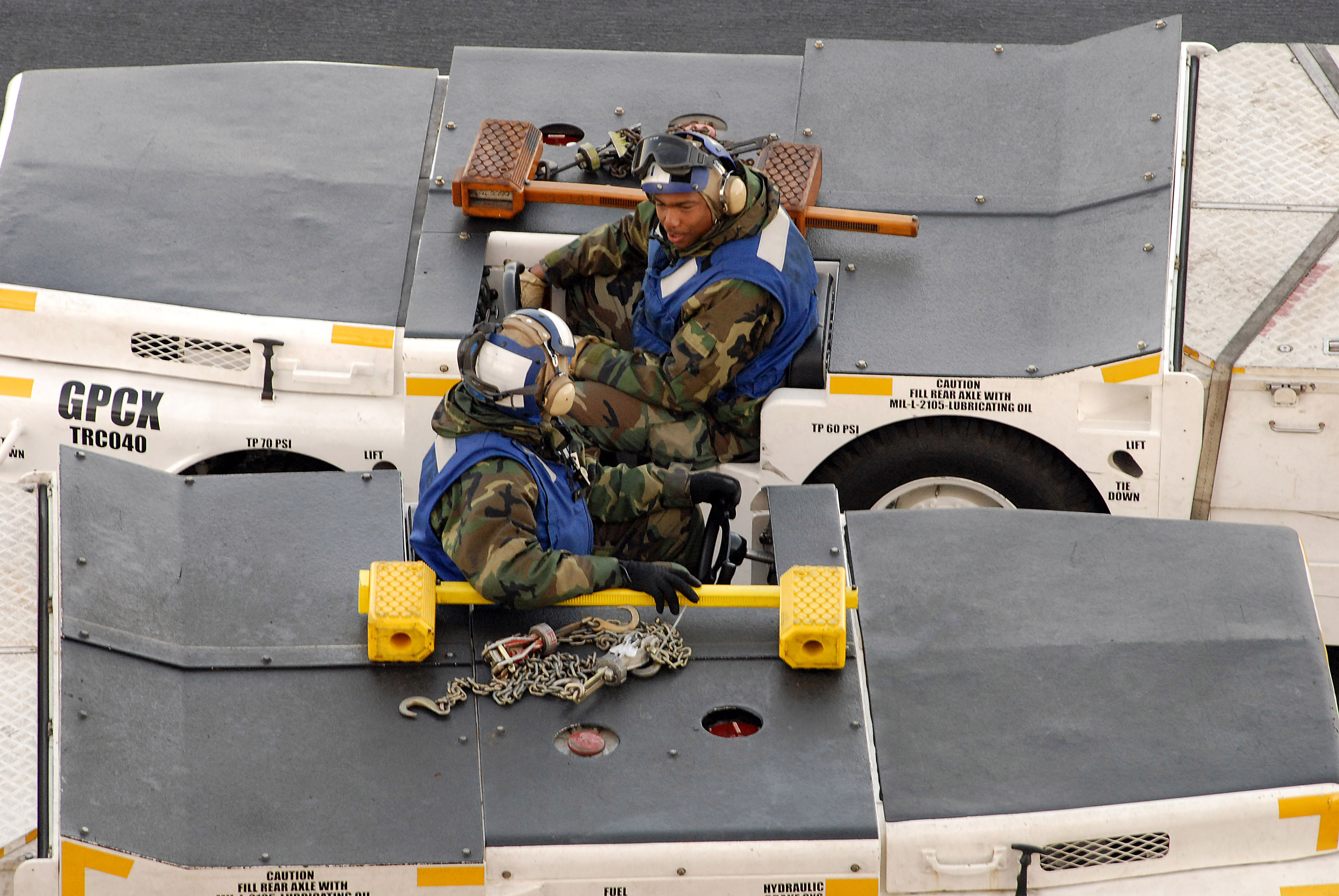
Blueshirts move, chock, and chain aircraft at the direction of yellowshirts.

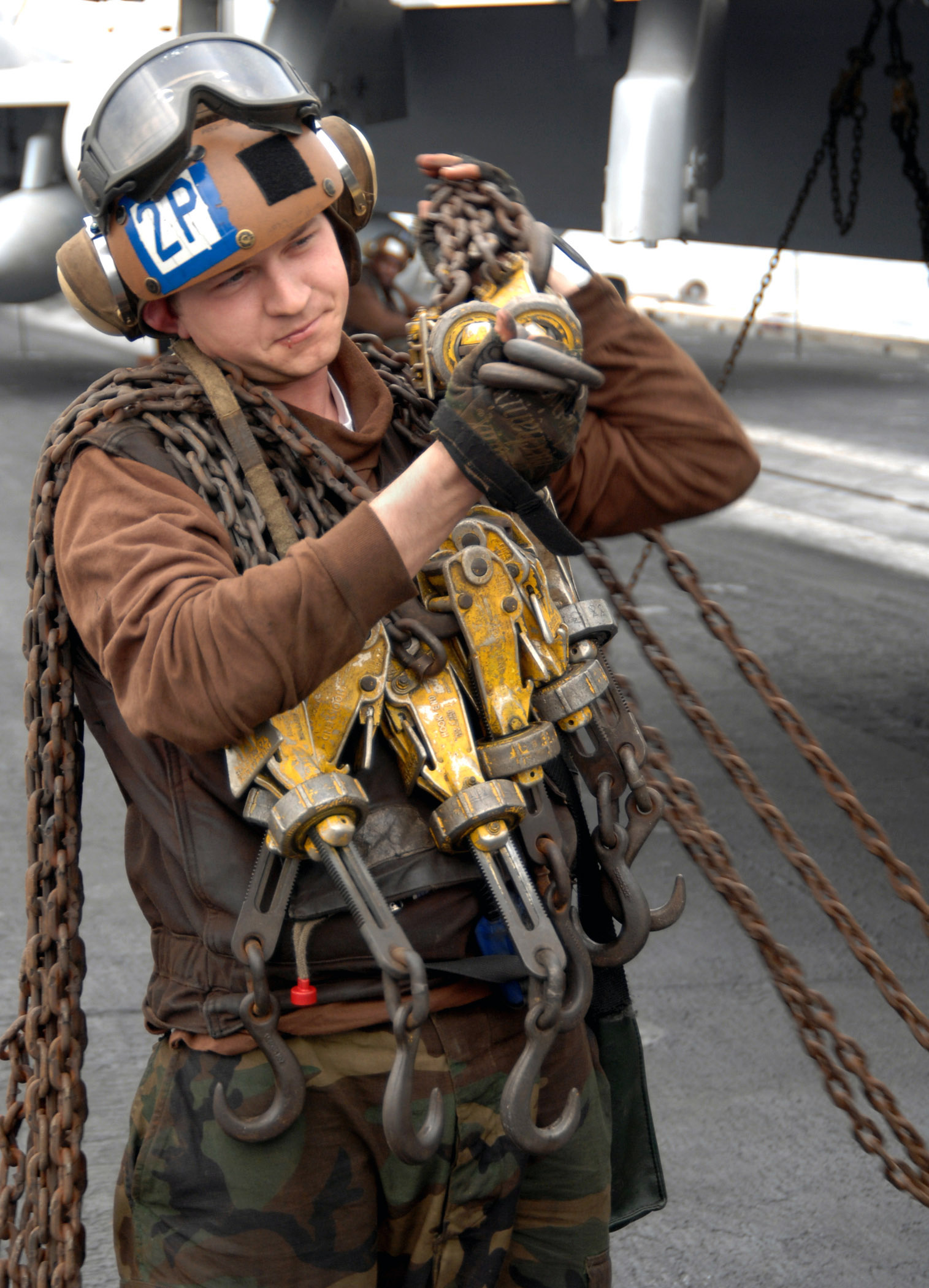
Plane captains wear brown and are responsible for preparing/inspecting aircraft for flight.

Green shirts are generally aircraft or equipment maintenance personnel.

Squadron aircraft mechanics wear green shirts.

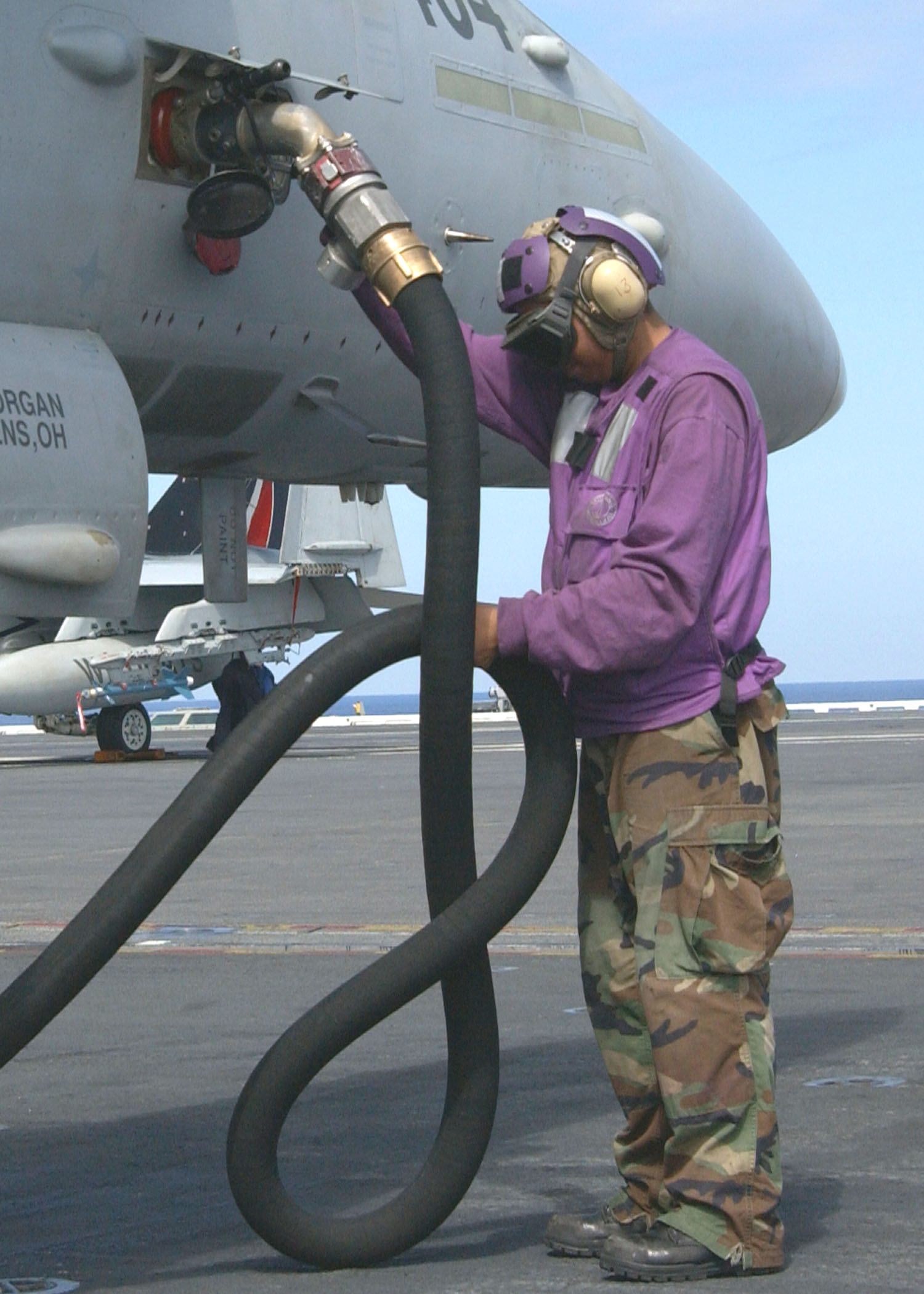
Fuel personnel wear purple and are affectionately known as "grapes".

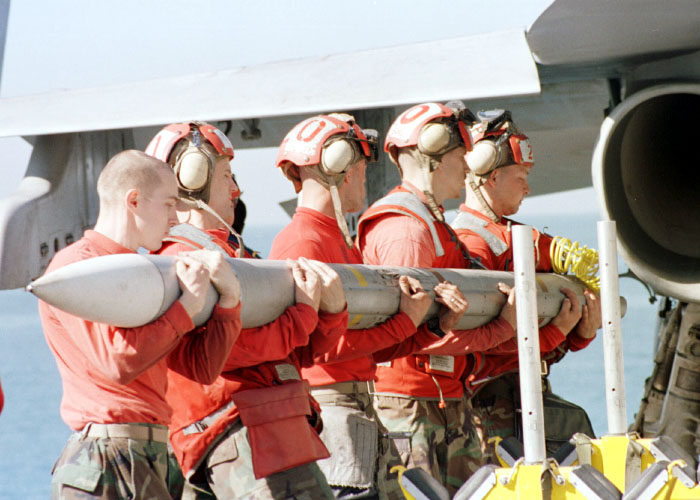
Aviation ordnance personnel ("ordies") wear red.

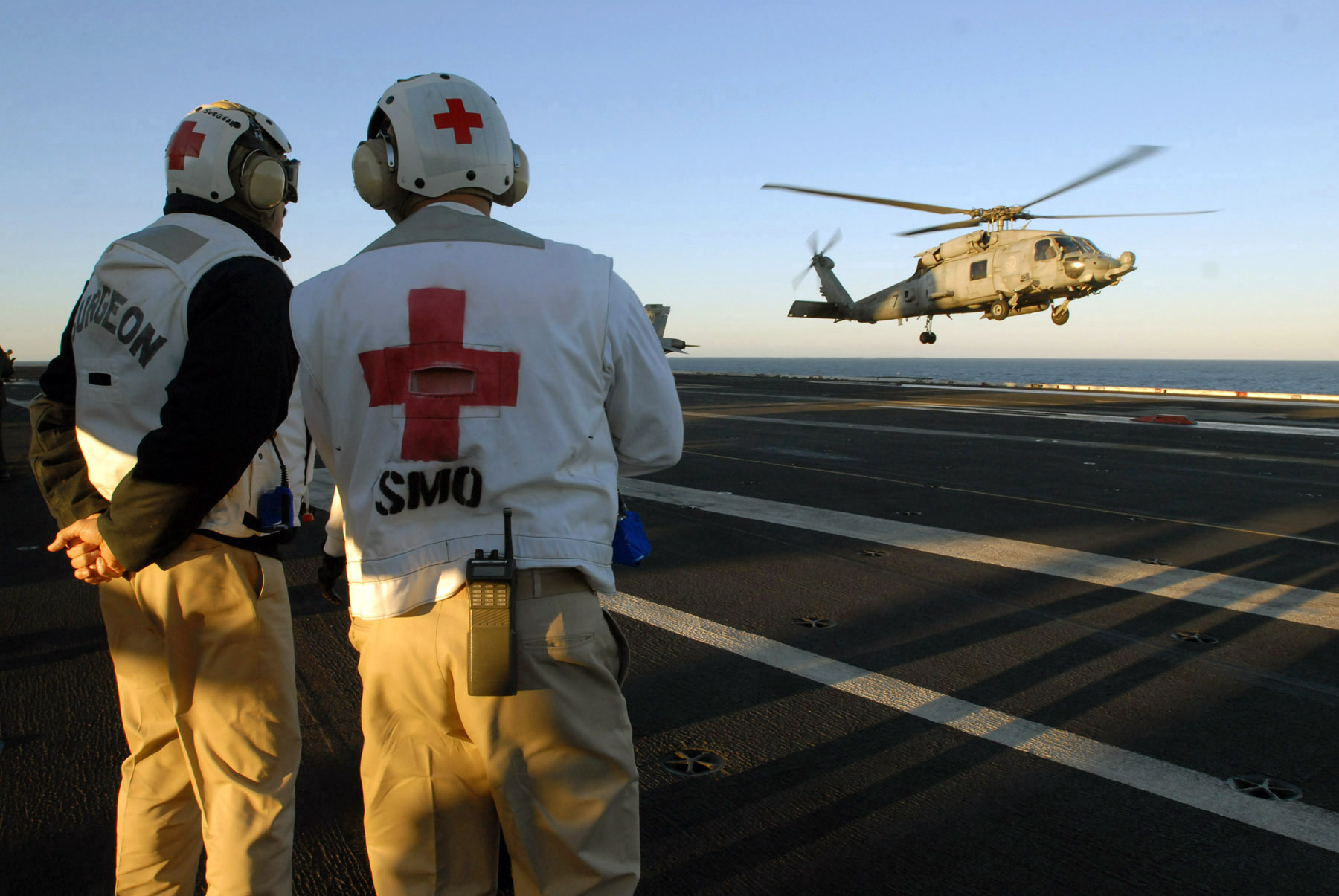
Senior medical officers and flight surgeons wear white with Red Cross emblems.

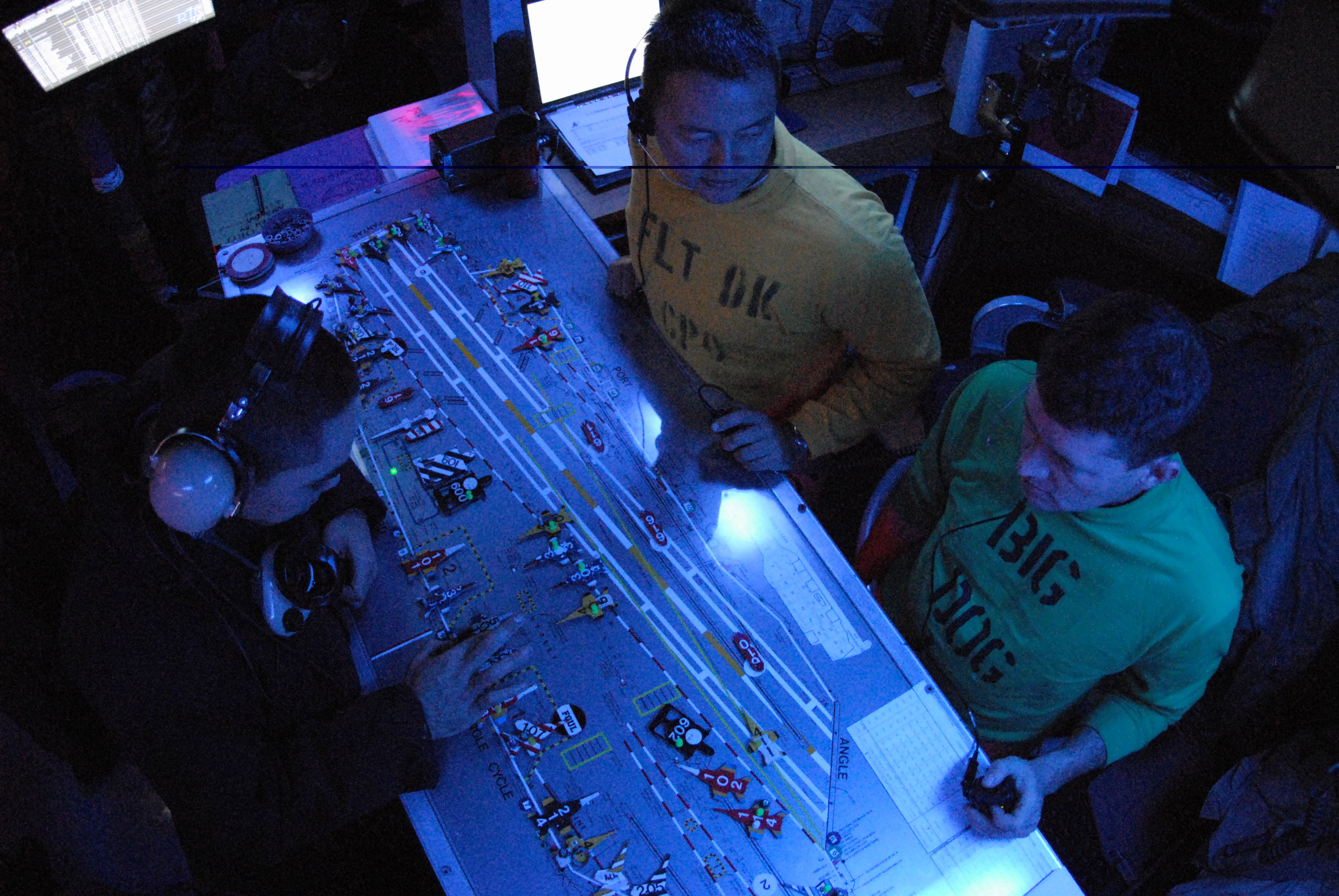
Flight deck control ouija board

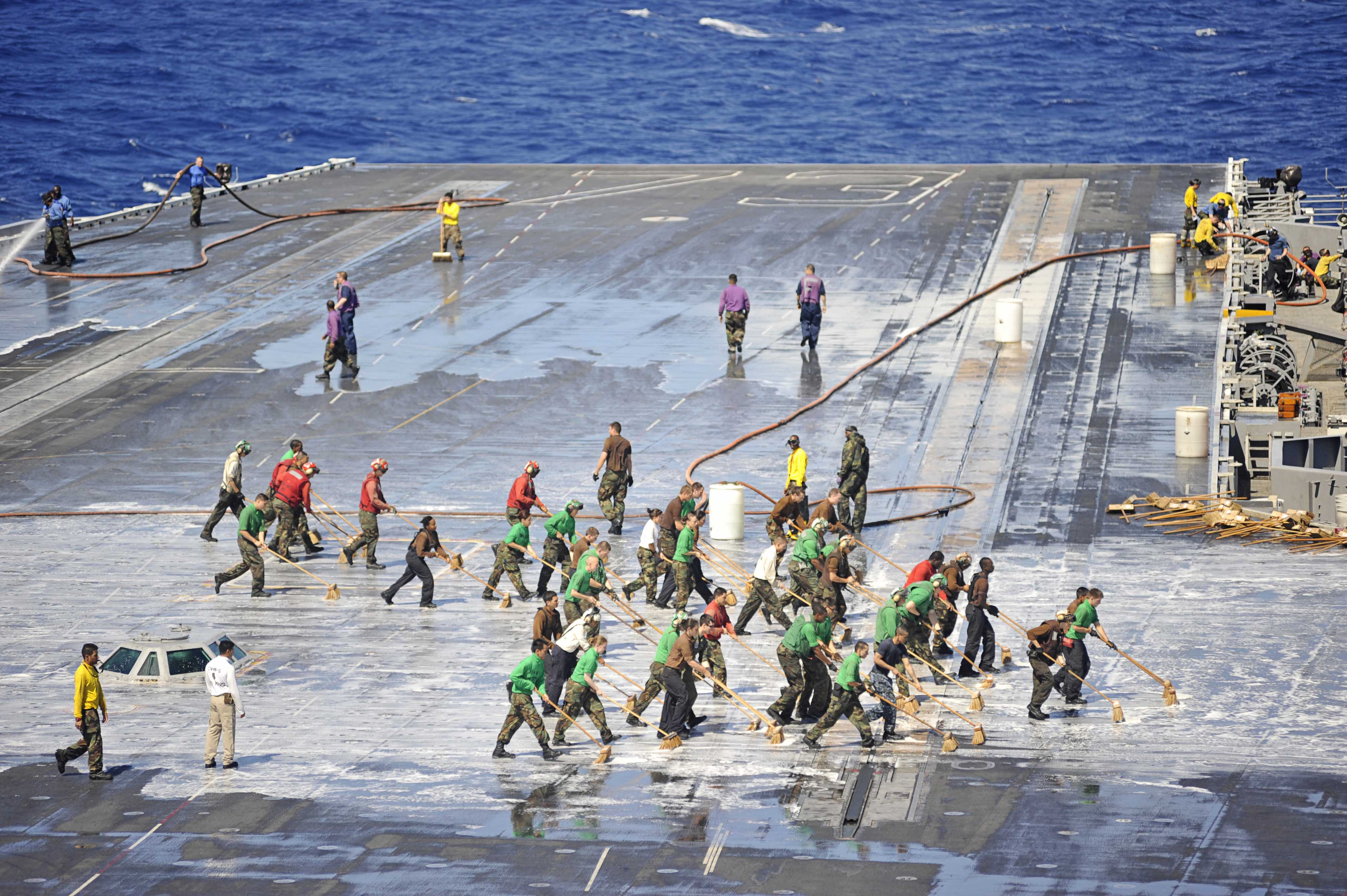
Cleaning the flight deck

== See also ==
- Carrier strike group
- Carrier-based aircraft
- Electronics Technician
- List of inactive United States Navy aircraft squadrons
- List of United States Navy aircraft designations (pre-1962) / List of United States naval aircraft
- List of United States Navy aircraft squadrons
- Military aviation
- NATOPS
- Naval aviation
- United States Marine Corps Aviation
- United States Naval Aviator
