= Aviation boatswain's mate =

United States Navy occupational rating

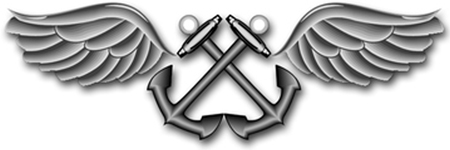
- insignia
- Issued by: United States Navy
- Type: Enlisted rating
- Abbreviation: AB
- Specialty: Aviation

Aviation boatswain's mate (abbreviated as AB) is a United States Navy occupational rating.

== Employment and sub specialties ==
Aviation boatswain's mates operate, maintain, and perform organizational maintenance on catapults, arresting gear, barricades, and associated flightdeck launching and recovery equipment; operate and service aircraft ground-handling equipment and machinery; operate and service aircraft crash, firefighting, and rescue equipment; handle aircraft afloat and ashore; operate, maintain, and repair aviation fueling, defueling, lubricating oil, and inert gas systems; perform crash rescue, crash removal, and damage control duties.

=== Aviation boatswain's mate, equipment ===
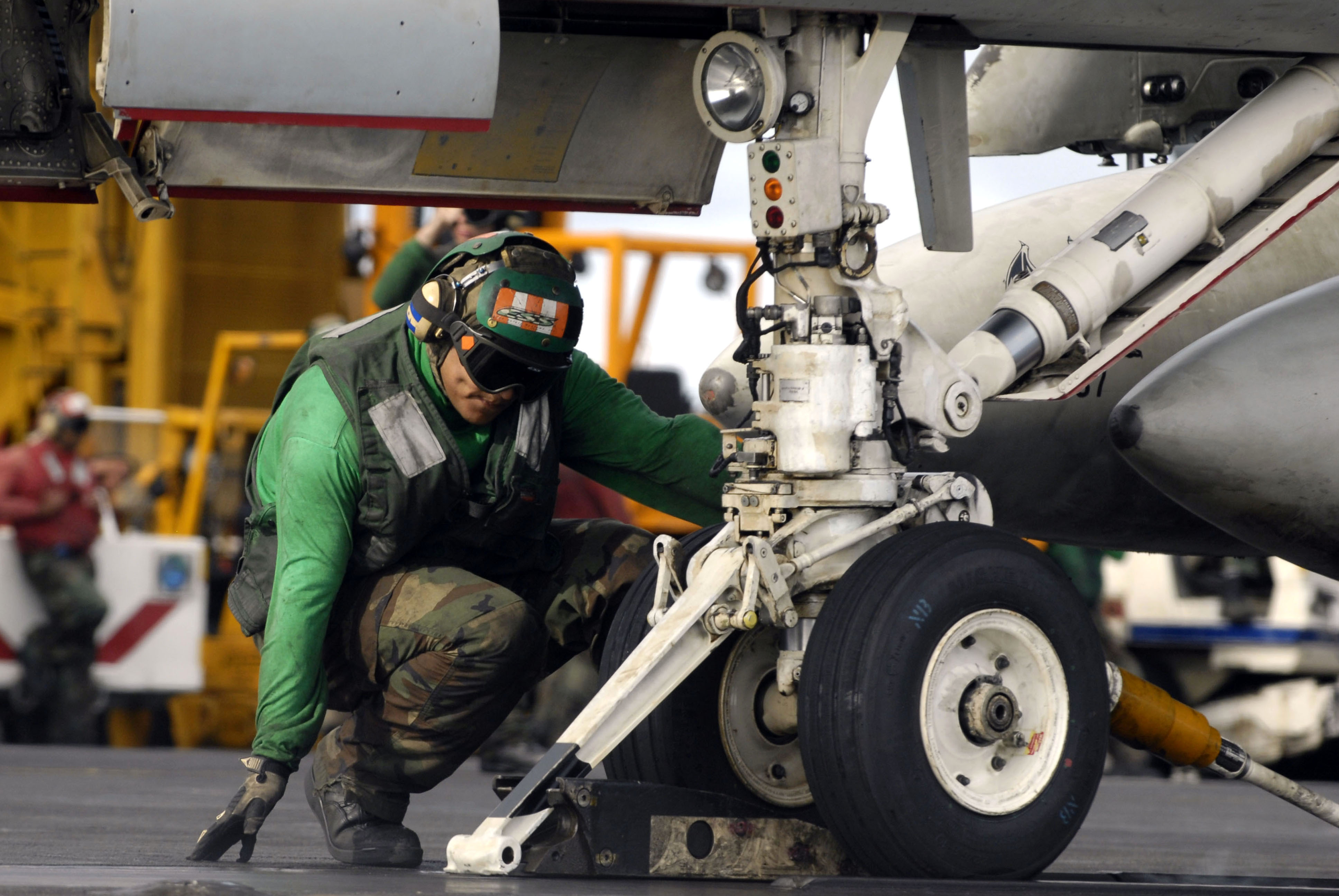
"Hookup man" ensures that aircraft launchbar (left) and holdback fitting (right) are properly seated in the catapult.

Aviation boatswain's mates, equipment (ABEs) operate and perform maintenance on steam and electromagnetic (EMALS) catapults, barricades, arresting gear, and associated equipment ashore and afloat; operate catapult hydraulic systems, retraction engines, water brakes, jet blast deflectors, deckedge and integrated catapult control stations (ICCS), and jet blast deflector control panels; arresting gear engines, sheave dampers, deckedge control station, and associated equipment; perform aircraft handling duties related to the operation of aircraft launching and recovery equipment.

Most of the work in this rating is performed outdoors on the flight deck of aircraft carriers, in all climatic conditions, in fast-paced and often potentially hazardous environments. The other portion of work ABE’s complete is ashore, working on Navy airfield arresting gear engines. Although most of the operations are only visible on the flight deck, the equipment responsible for the functioning of launch and recovery operations is 95% below decks. ABEs work closely with others in aviation ratings such as Aviation Boatswains Mate Handling.

=== Aviation boatswain's mate, fuels ===
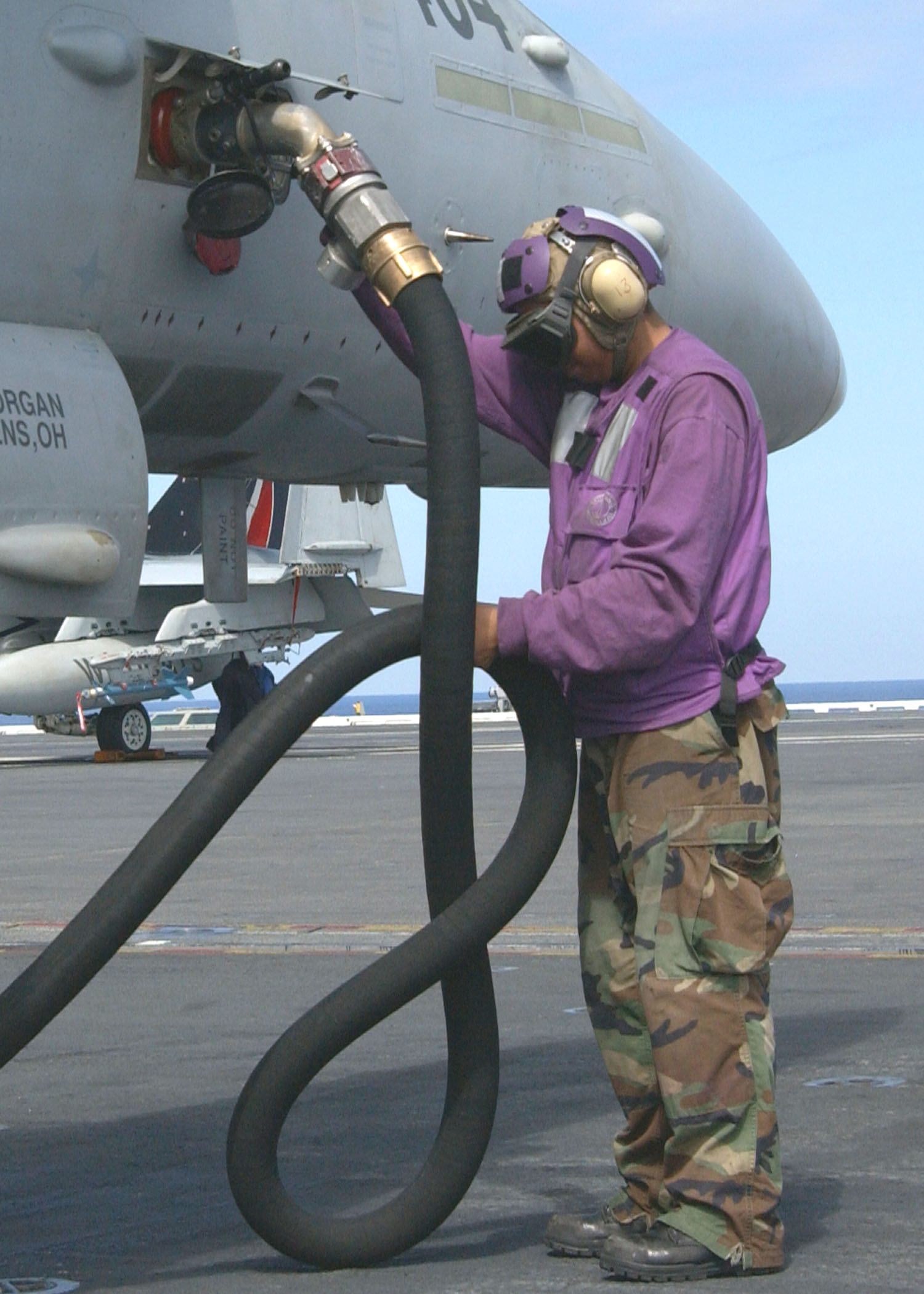
Aviation fuel handlers wear purple turtleneck jersey and are called "grapes".

Aviation boatswain's mates, fuels (ABFs) play a major part in launching and recovering naval aircraft quickly and safely from land or ships. This includes aircraft fuelling and fuel systems. Later in their careers ABFs can earn the advanced AB rating that requires supervision of all these individual specialties.

The duties performed by ABFs include:

- Operating, maintaining and performing organizational maintenance on aviation fueling and lubricating oil systems on CVNs, CVs, landing helicopter docks (LHDs), LHAs, and LPDs
- Observing and enforcing handling safety precautions and maintaining fuel quality surveillance and control in aviation fuel systems;
- Supervising the operation and servicing of fuel farms and equipment associated with the fueling and de-fueling of aircraft ashore and afloat
- Training, directing and supervising fire fighting crews, fire rescue teams, and damage control parties in assigned fuel and lubricating oil spaces.

This rating's work is performed outdoors, atop aircraft carrier decks, in all climatic conditions, and in fast-paced hazardous environments. ABFs or "grapes" work closely in concert with: aircraft handlers (yellow shirts), chocks and chains (blue shirts), plane captains (brown shirts), aviation maintenance technicians (green shirts), and various other aviation and shipboard ratings. ABFs additionally work in the bottom levels of a ship, such as the pump rooms and filter rooms where purifying fuel and then subsequently pumping refined fuels to their flight deck counterparts. Working lower levels of a ship earns one the title, "snipe"; concisely, lower levels of a ship remain excessively hot, dark, grimy, noisy, poorly ventilated, and unforgiving.

=== Aviation boatswain's mates, handling ===
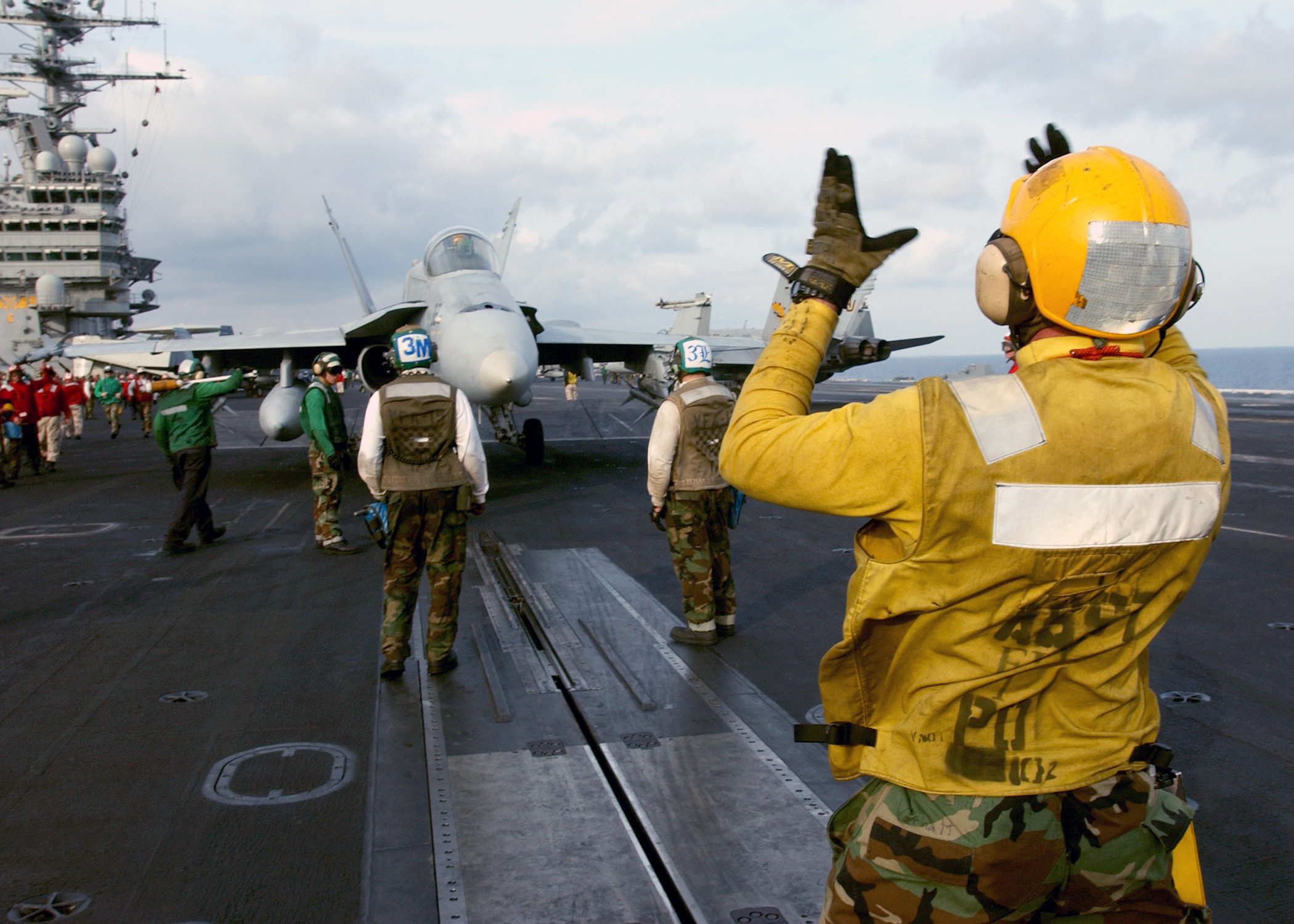
ABHs ("yellowshirts") direct the movement of all aircraft

Aviation boatswain's mates, handling (ABHs) play a major part in launching and recovering naval aircraft quickly and safely from land or ships. This includes aircraft handling, fire fighting and salvage and rescue operations. Later in their careers ABHs can earn the advanced AB rating that requires supervision of all these individual specialties. Other job assignments include deck edge elevator operator, working the spotting board in flight deck control, tractor driver, tractor king (who dispatches tractors, and supervises tractor drivers) and performs aircraft engine starting. Handlers also operate mobile crash cranes and mobile firefighting vehicles on the flight deck and hangar bay. ABHs can also be assigned to in-port fire crew, and damage control petty officer (DCPO), which are in charge of the material condition and battle readiness of divisional work spaces.

The duties performed by ABHs include:

- Supervising the movement, spotting and securing of aircraft and equipment ashore and afloat. Often called "the salt of the deck", because they are the enlisted leaders of on deck.
- Performing crash rescue, fire fighting, crash removal and damage control duties in connection with launching and recovery of aircraft.

Most of the work in this rating is performed outdoors on the deck of aircraft carriers, in all climatic conditions, in fast-paced and often potentially hazardous environments. ABHs work closely with others in aviation ratings.
