= Go-around =

Aborted landing of an aircraft

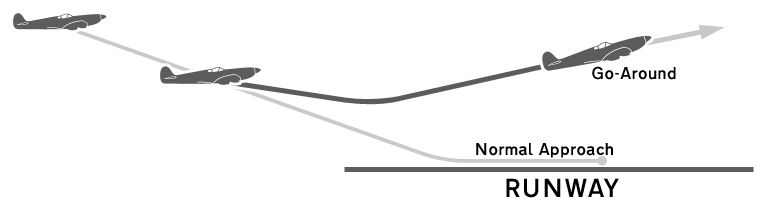

In aviation, a go-around is an aborted landing of an aircraft that is on final approach or has already touched down. A go-around can either be initiated by the pilot flying or requested by air traffic control for various reasons, such as an unstabilized approach or an obstruction on the runway.

== Etymology ==
The term arises from the traditional use of traffic patterns at airfields. A landing aircraft will first join the traffic pattern/circuit and prepare for landing. If for some reason, the pilot decides not to land, the pilot can simply fly back up to traffic pattern altitude/circuit height, and complete another circuit. The term "go-around" is still used even for modern airliners, though they often do not use traditional traffic patterns/circuits for landing, instead using an airport-specific go-around procedure.

== Reasons for use ==
Initiation of a go-around may be either ordered by air traffic control (normally the local or tower controller in a controlled field) or initiated by the pilot in command of the aircraft for a variety of reasons, such as an unstabilised approach, improperly executed landing ("bounce"), mechanical issue, sudden wind change, unsafe flight condition, or traffic on the runway.

In naval aviation, the term wave-off is used instead of go-around. When touching down on an aircraft carrier, a pilot always initiates a wave-off by applying full thrust as a fail-safe measure. If the plane's tail hook fails to catch any of the arrestor cables (known as a (deck) "bolter") the aircraft can climb again. If the tailhook catches a cable, the aircraft will stop in short order regardless. Conversely, if a wave-off were not initiated and the aircraft were not arrested, it would not have enough power and/or runway to fly off the carrier safely.

Many airlines and aircraft operators state a list of conditions that must be satisfied so that a safe landing can be carried out. If one or more of these conditions cannot be satisfied then a go-around should be considered in some cases and must be carried out in others. This list is usually written in airline or manufacturer's operations manual which must be approved by the relevant aviation authority. The operator's list of conditions allows pilots to use their individual judgment outside of this scope.

== Procedure ==
When the pilot is instructed or decides to go around, the pilot applies full thrust or a predetermined TOGA (Takeoff and Go Around) thrust to the engine(s), adopts an appropriate climb attitude and airspeed, raises the landing gear when the airplane has achieved a positive climb rate, retracts the flaps as necessary, follows the instructions of the control tower (in controlled airspace), and typically climbs into the traffic pattern or follows the published go-around procedure for another approach. Otherwise, the pilot may elect to divert to an alternate airport or wait while circling over the landing airport for some time, especially if the go-around was necessitated by bad weather.

Many modern aircraft, such as most Boeing and Airbus aircraft, have autothrottle/autothrust systems that will set go-around thrust if they are engaged.

On other aircraft, the pilot configures manually for a go-around. In a typical small aircraft, such as those found in general aviation, this might involve:

- Applying go around power (usually full power on normally aspirated engines).
- Adopting an appropriate climb attitude and airspeed.
- Retracting one stage of flaps if necessary.
- Checking for a positive rate of climb, and raising the landing gear if equipped with retractable landing gear.
- Retracting the flaps fully when the aircraft achieves a certain safe airspeed and altitude.
- Climbing to cleared altitude, or pattern altitude if at a non-towered airfield.
- Advising ATC if go around was pilot initiated, or acknowledging ATC instructions if at a controlled airfield.

== Safety ==
Go-arounds occur with an average rate of 1–3 per 1000 approaches. Go-around rates vary between different aircraft operators and operational environments.

A go-around is not an emergency, and may be necessary for a number of reasons. Some of those include; unstable approach, unable to land in the touchdown zone, not in correct configuration, directed by ATC, obstacle on the runway (aircraft, vehicle, animal), or aircraft controllability issues.

Half of commercial jet crashes between 2012 through 2021 occurred during the approach, landing and go-around flight phases. In 2011, 68% (63) of accidents in commercial aviation occurred during these phases of flight.

The lack of go-around decision is the leading risk factor in approach and landing accidents, and it is also the primary cause of runway excursions during landing. Yet, only an estimated 3–5% of unstabilised approaches lead to a go-around. One in ten go-around reports record a potentially hazardous go-around outcome, including exceeded aircraft performance limits or fuel endurance.

A study by Embry–Riddle Aeronautical University on a particular US air carrier conducted to determine predictors of an unstable approach based on conditions at 500 feet (150 m) AGL, has shown that factors with the highest correlation were, in order:

1. Thrust levers at idle,
2. Autothrottle deactivated,
3. Speed brakes (air brakes) deployed,
4. Glideslope deviation,
5. Localizer deviation,
6. Flaps not extended,
7. Rate of descent deviation, and
8. Approach speed (V_{ref}) deviation.
9. Incomplete landing checklist

A go-around is a relatively rare maneuver for most commercial pilots. On average, a short-haul pilot may make a go-around once or twice a year, and a long-haul pilot may make one every 2 to 3 years.

Going around carries risks which include:

- Ineffective initiation of go-around can lead to loss of control (LOC).
- Failure to maintain control during go-around can lead to LOC, including abnormal contact with the runway, or to controlled flight into terrain (CFIT).
- Failure to fly required track can lead to CFIT or mid-air collision (MAC).
- Failure to maintain traffic separation can lead to MAC.
- Wake turbulence generated may create a hazard to another aircraft that can lead to LOC.

== Baulked landing ==
A baulked landing or rejected landing is an unofficial term that usually refer to a very late go-around, initiated when the aircraft is below the prescribed Decision Height or Minimum Descent Altitude or even when the aircraft has touched down. A baulked landing is considered a high risk go-around as the aircraft is typically in a low energy state with low altitude, idle thrust and decelerating airspeed. Additionally, as the aircraft is below the prescribed Decision Height or Minimum Descent Altitude, there is a greater risk of collisions with obstacles and terrain even when following the established missed approach procedure, which may result in Controlled Flight Into Terrain (CFIT).

== See also ==
- Index of aviation articles
- List of aviation mnemonics
- Missed approach, a related concept in the context of IFR flight
- Touch-and-go landing, a type of go-around where the aircraft physically touches the ground, continues along the runway and then takes off again
- Bolter, a go-around where arresting gear is not engaged
