= Optical landing system =

Visual landing system used on US Navy aircraft carriers

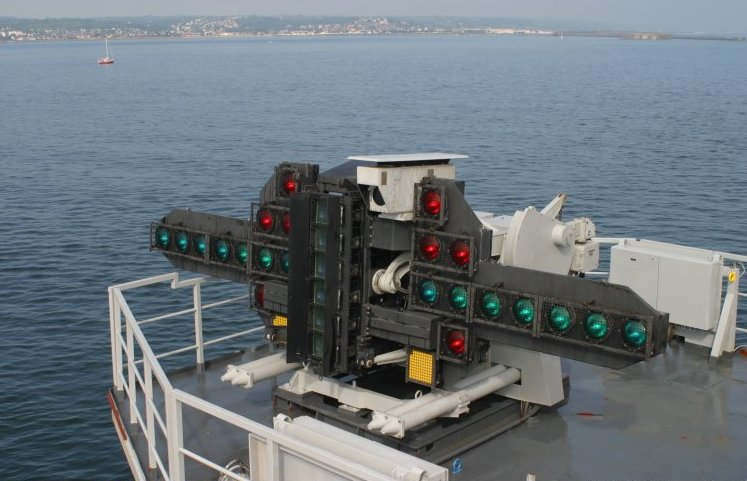
The fresnel lens optical landing system of Charles de Gaulle

An optical landing system (OLS) (nicknamed "meatball" or simply "ball") is used to give glidepath information to pilots in the terminal phase of landing on an aircraft carrier.

From the beginning of aircraft landing on ships in the 1920s to the introduction of OLSs, pilots relied solely on their visual perception of the landing area and the aid of the Landing Signal Officer (LSO in the U.S. Navy, or "batsman" in the Commonwealth navies). LSOs used coloured flags, cloth paddles and lighted wands. The OLS was developed after World War II by the British and was deployed on U.S. Navy carriers from 1955. In its developed form, the OLS consists of a horizontal row of green lights, used as a reference, and a column of vertical lights. The vertical lights signal whether the aircraft is too high, too low, or at the correct altitude as the pilot descends the glide slope towards the carrier's deck. Other lights give various commands and can be used to require the pilot to abort the landing and "go around." The OLS remains under control of the LSO, who can also communicate with the pilot via radio.

== Components ==
Diagram showing parts of OLS

An optical landing system has several related components: the lights used to give visual cues to approaching aircraft, the light control system, and the mounting system.

=== Lights ===
Comparison of PAPI, VASI, and OLS meatball and datum lights (not to scale)

At least three sets of lights are used, regardless of the actual technology:

- Datum lights – a horizontal row of green lamps used to give the pilot a reference against which he may judge his position relative to the glide slope.
- Ball (or "meatball"; also known as "the source") – indicates the relative position of the aircraft with reference to glide slope. If the aircraft is high, the ball will be above the datum lights; if the aircraft is low, the ball will be similarly below the datum lights. The further the aircraft is from the glide slope, the further the ball will be above or below the datum lights. If the aircraft gets dangerously low, the ball appears red. If the aircraft gets too high, the ball appears to go off the top.
- Wave-off lights – red flashing lamps which, when lit, indicate that the pilot must add full power and go around – a mandatory command. When the wave-off lights are lit, all other lamps are extinguished. The wave-off lights are operated manually by the LSO.

Some (particularly later) optical landing systems include additional lamps:

- Cut lights – Green lamps used to signal different things based on where the approaching aircraft is in its approach. Named for its original use in commanding aircraft on pre-angled deck landings to throttle down to idle prior to landing; still in use for crash-barrier landings. Early in a no-radio or "zip-lip" approach (which is routine in modern carrier operations), cut lights are flashed for approximately 2–3 seconds to indicate that the aircraft is cleared to continue the approach. Subsequent flashes are used to prompt the pilot to add power. The longer the lights are left on, the more power should be added. Cut lights are operated manually by the LSO.
- Emergency wave-off lights – Red lamps that have the identical function as Wave-Off Lights, but use an alternate power source. Not normally used.

=== Light controls ===
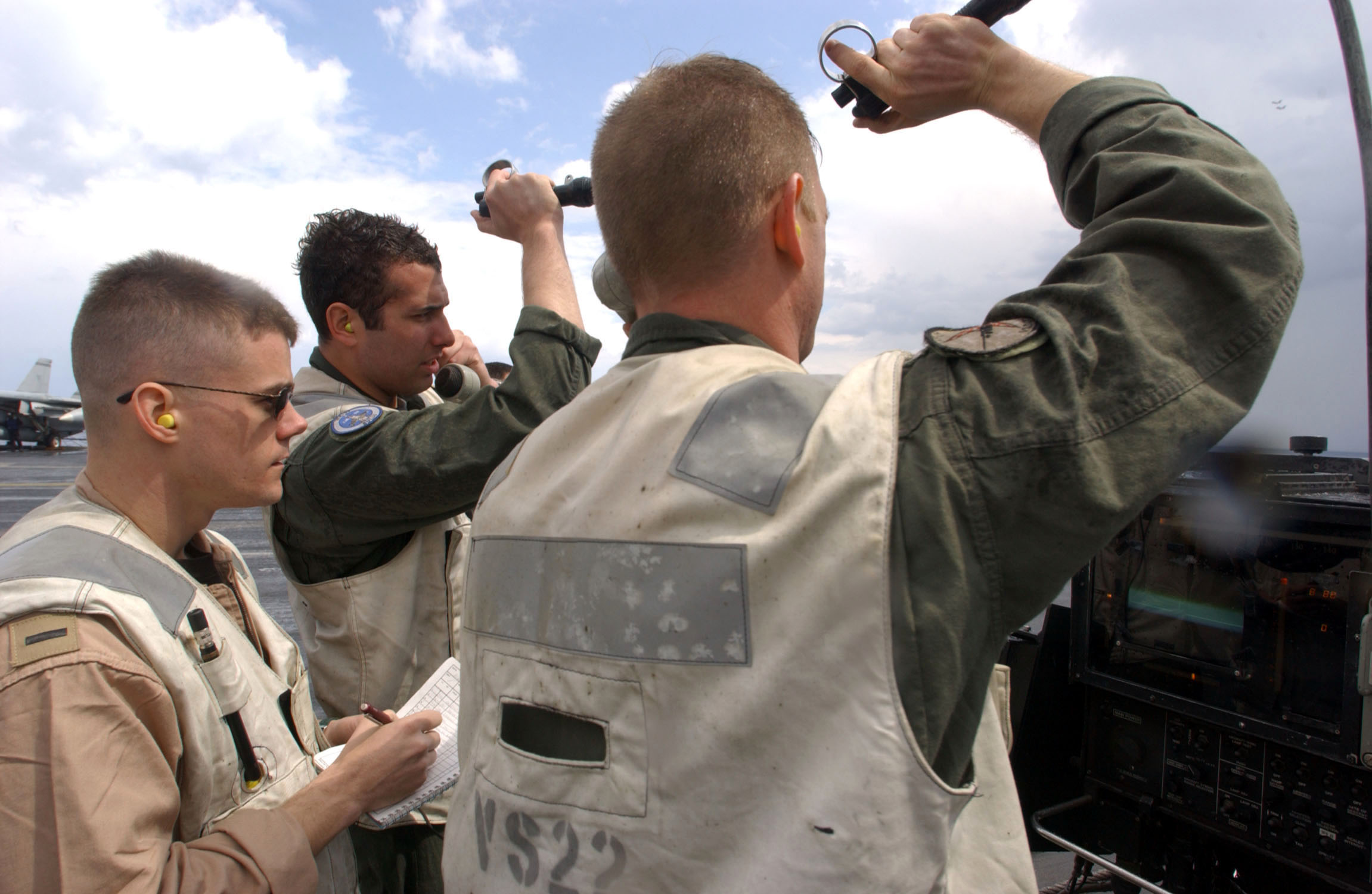
LSOs hold the "pickle", which controls lights on the OLS. The controller is held above the head until the landing area is clear and the arresting gear is set.

Collectively, the apparatus that the lights are mounted on is called the "lens". It is turned on/off and brightness is adjusted at the lens itself for ground-based units, and remotely for shipboard units. In both cases, the lens is connected to a hand-controller (called the "pickle") used by the LSOs. The pickle has buttons that control the wave-off and cut lights.

=== Light mounting ===
For shore-based optical landing systems, the lights are typically mounted on a mobile unit that plugs into a power source. Once set up and calibrated, there are no moving parts to the unit. Shipboard units are much more complicated as they must be gyroscopically stabilised to compensate for ship movement. Additionally, shipboard units are mechanically moved (the "roll angle") to adjust the touchdown point of each aircraft. With this adjustment, the tailhook touchdown point can be precisely targeted based on the tailhook-to-pilot's-eye distance for each aircraft type.

== Mirror landing aid ==
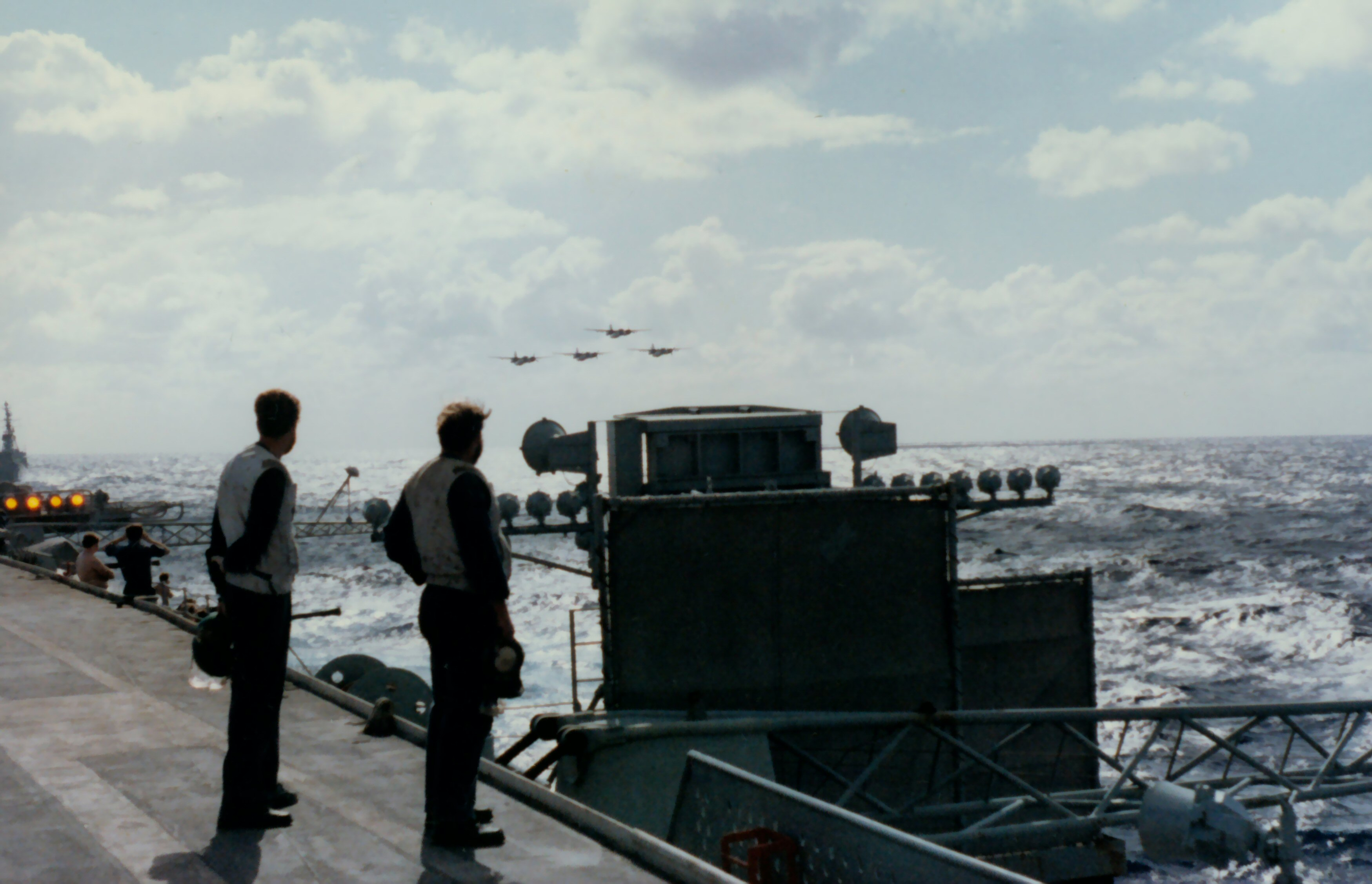
The rear of the mirror landing aid of HMAS Melbourne. The datum lamps and the two large "wave off" lamps are clearly visible as are, at the left of the photo, four of the orange lamps projected into the mirror to give the "ball".

The first OLS was the mirror landing aid, one of several British inventions made after the Second World War revolutionising the design of aircraft carriers. The others were the steam catapult and the angled flight deck. The mirror landing aid was invented by Nicholas Goodhart. It was tested on the carriers HMS Illustrious and HMS Indomitable before being introduced on British carriers in 1954 and on US carriers in 1955.

The mirror landing aid was a gyroscopically controlled concave mirror on the port side of the flight deck. On either side of the mirror was a line of green coloured "datum lights". A bright orange "source" light was shone into the mirror creating the "ball" (or "meatball" in later USN parlance) which could be seen by the aviator who was about to land. The position of the ball compared to the datum lights indicated the aircraft's position in relation to the desired glidepath: if the ball was above the datum, the plane was high; below the datum, the plane was low; between the datum, the plane was on glidepath. The gyro stabilisation compensated for much of the movement of the flight deck due to the sea, giving a constant glidepath.

Initially, the device was thought able to allow the pilot to land without direction from the LSO. However, accident rates actually increased upon the system's initial introduction, so the current system of including the LSO was developed. This development, along with the others mentioned, contributed to the US carrier landing accident rate plummeting from 35 per 10,000 landings in 1954 to 7 per 10,000 landings in 1957.

The LSO, who is a specially qualified and experienced Navy pilot, provides additional input to the pilot via radios, advising of power requirements, position relative to glide path and centerline. The LSO can also use a combination of lights attached to the OLS to indicate "go around" using the bright red, flashing wave off lights. Additional signals, such as "cleared to land", "add power", or "divert" can be signaled using with a row of green "cut" lights or a combination thereof.

== Fresnel lens optical landing system (FLOLS) ==
Later systems kept the same basic function of the mirror landing aid, but upgraded components and functionality. The concave mirror, source light combination was replaced with a series of fresnel lenses. The Mk 6 Mod 3 FLOLS was tested in 1970 and had not changed much, except for when ship's heave was taken into account with an inertial stabilisation system. These systems are still in wide use on runways at US Naval Air Stations.

== Improved fresnel lens optical landing system (IFLOLS) ==
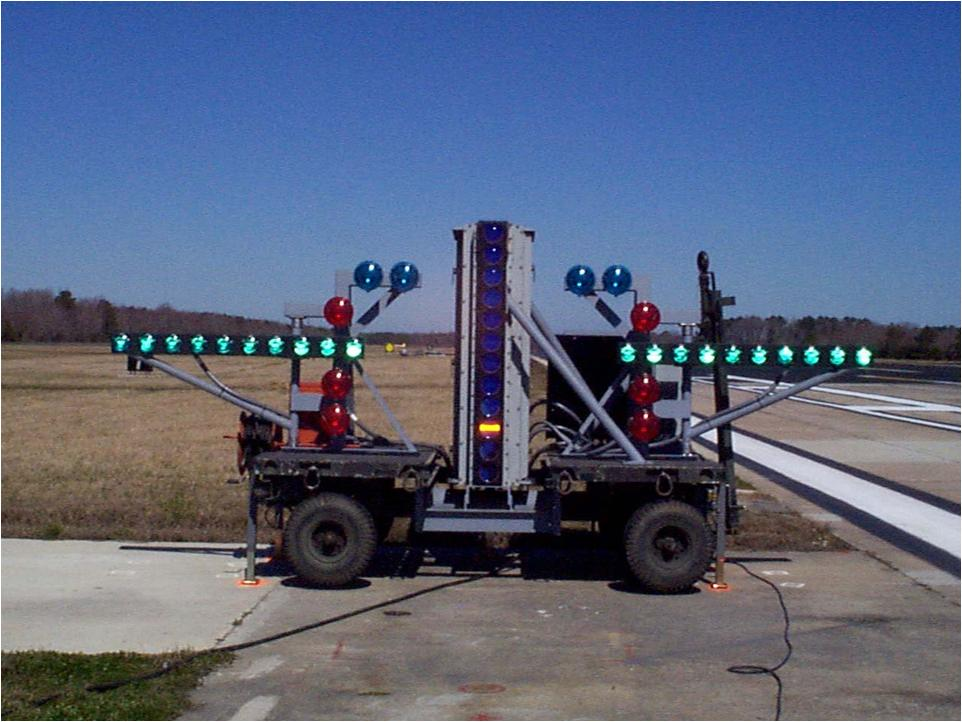
IFLOLS at field

The IFLOLS, designed by engineers at NAEC Lakehurst, keeps the same basic design but improves on the FLOLS, giving a more precise indication of aircraft position on the glideslope. A prototype IFLOLS was tested on board USS George Washington (CVN-73) in 1997, and every deploying aircraft carrier since 2004 has had the system. The improved fresnel lens optical landing system, IFLOLS, uses a fiber optic "source" light, projected through lenses to present a sharper, crisper light. This has enabled pilots to begin to fly "the ball" further away from the ship making the transition from instrument flight to visual flight smoother. Additional improvements include better deck motion compensation due to internalisation of the stabilising mechanisms, as well as multiple sources of stabilisation from gyroscopes as well as radar.

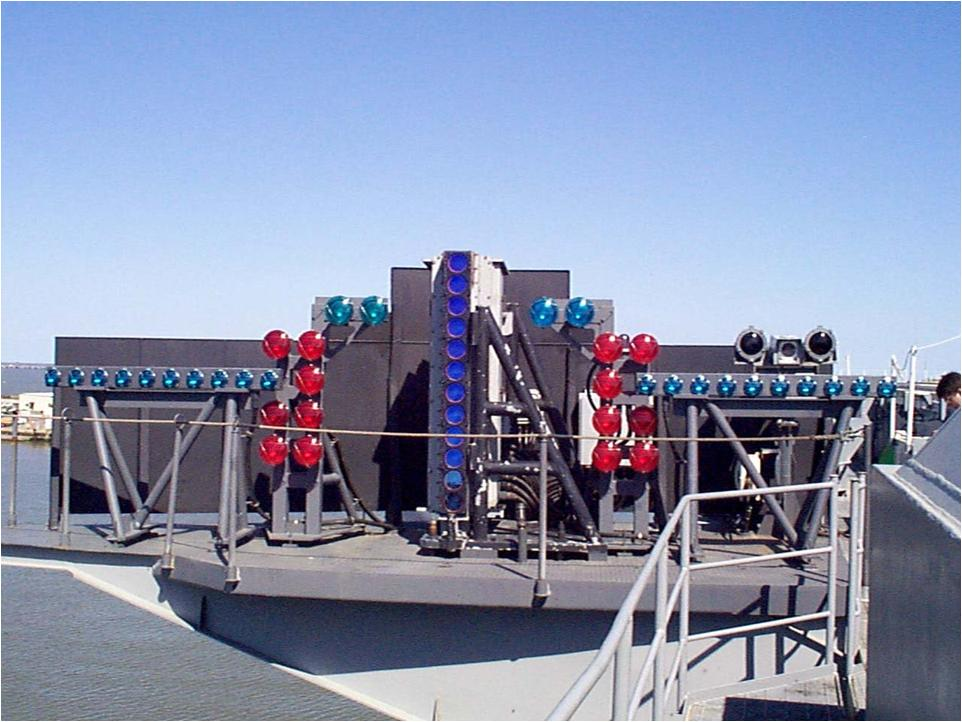
IFLOLS aboard ship

== Manually operated visual landing aid system (MOVLAS) ==
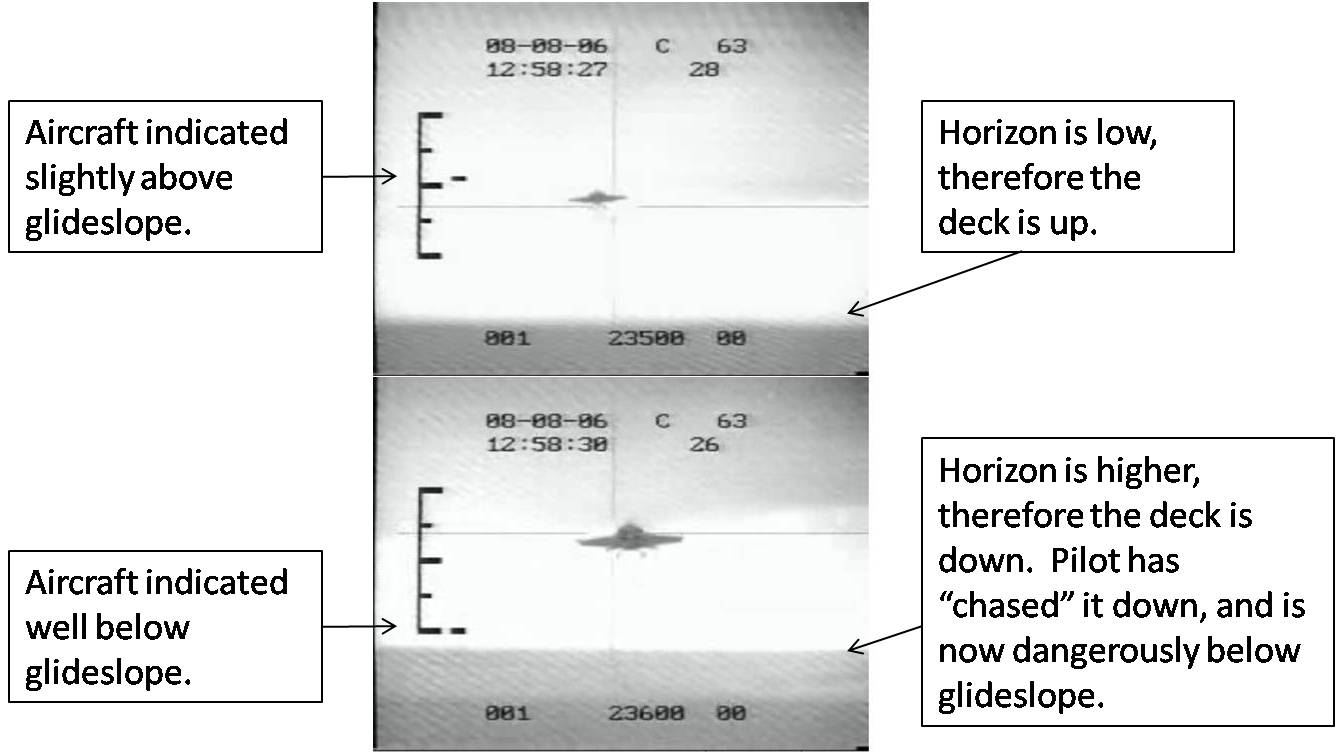
MOVLAS repeater on integrated launch and recovery television surveillance system (ILARTS)

The MOVLAS is a backup visual landing aid system used when the primary optical system (IFLOLS) is inoperable, stabilisation limits are exceeded or unreliable (primarily due to extreme sea states causing a pitching deck), and for pilot/LSO training. The system is designed to present glideslope information in the same visual form presented by the FLOLS.

There are three installation modes aboard ship: STATION 1 is immediately in front of the FLOLS and utilises the FLOLS waveoff, datum, and cut light displays. STATION 2 and 3 are independent of the FLOLS and are located on the flight deck port and starboard side respectively. MOVLAS is nothing more than a vertical series of orange lamps manually controlled by the LSO with a hand controller to simulate the ball; it does not automatically compensate for the ship's movement in any way. All MOVLAS equipment is maintained and rigged by the ICs and EMs within V2 Division of Air Department.

=== MOVLAS components ===
Lightbox
MOVLAS is nothing more than a vertical series of orange lamps manually controlled by the LSO with a hand controller to simulate the ball.
Hand controller
The hand controller is located at the LSO workstation. A handle is provided so the LSO may select the position of the meatball. The pickle switch is attached to the end of the controller handle. As the handle on the LSO controller is moved up or down it lights three or four consecutive lamps in the light box thus providing a meatball.
Repeaters
MOVLAS repeaters show where the LSO is displaying the meatball to the pilot. One repeater is displayed on the integrated launch and recovery television surveillance system (ILARTS).

== Pitching deck ==
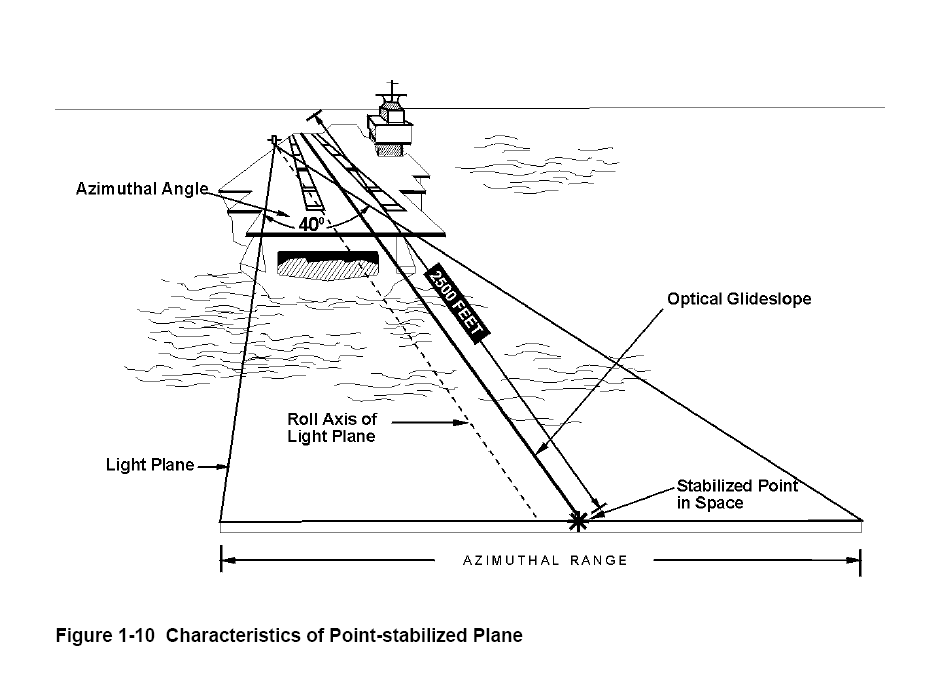
Point stabilisation from LSO NATOPS manual

The IFLOLS has two modes of stabilisation: line and inertial. The most precise is inertial stabilisation. In line stabilisation, the glide path is stabilised to infinity. As the deck pitches and rolls, the source lights are rolled to maintain a steady glide-slope fixed in space. Inertial stabilisation functions like line, but also compensates for the flight deck heave (the straight up and down component of deck motion). If the IFLOLS cannot keep up with the motion of the deck, the LSO can switch to the MOVLAS or simply perform "LSO talk downs." Only the most experienced LSOs will perform talk downs or control aircraft with MOVLAS during heavy sea states.

== See also ==
- Index of aviation articles
- Flight deck
- Modern United States Navy carrier air operations
- Visual approach slope indicator
