= Bolter (aeronautics) =

Aircraft that fails to hook onto aircraft carrier runway

Animation of a missed landing on a centreline flight deck (Yorktown-class aircraft carrier)

Animation of a missed landing, or bolter, on an angled flight deck (Centaur-class aircraft carrier)

In naval aviation, a bolter occurs when an aircraft attempting an arrested landing on the flight deck of an aircraft carrier touches down, but fails to catch an arrestor cable and come to a stop. Bolter aircraft accelerate at full throttle and become airborne in order to go-around and re-attempt the landing.

Prior to the development of the angled flight deck, aircraft carrier landing areas ran along the axis of the ship. If an aircraft failed to catch an arrestor cable on the aft (rear) of the ship, it would still need to be stopped prior to hitting aircraft spotted (parked or taxiing) on the forward half of the deck. With aircraft spotted on the forward half of the flight deck, there was not enough room for an aircraft to become airborne again after missing the arrestor wires. Stopping an aircraft that failed to engage an arrestor cable was accomplished with either a wire barrier rigged amidships and raised to catch the aircraft's landing gear, or a net barricade that would engage the aircraft's wings. Either method often resulted in damage to the aircraft and required time to disengage. The introduction of jet aircraft for carrier operations in the early 1950s, with their greater mass and higher approach speeds, exacerbated the problem.

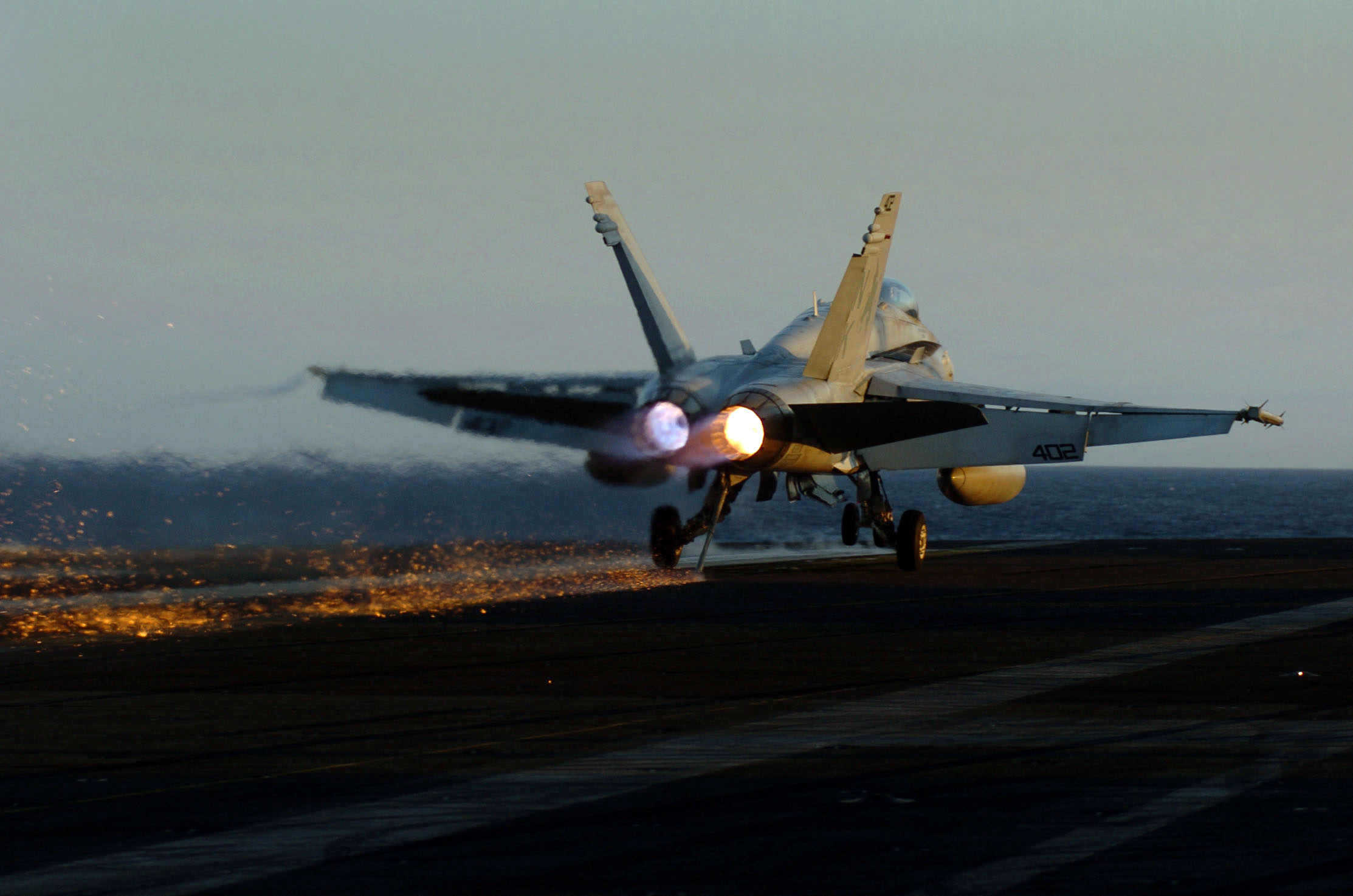
An F/A-18C Hornet that has failed to engage an arrestor wire on the aircraft carrier USS John C. Stennis and is attempting to bolter

The British-developed angled flight deck solved the problem of aircraft that failed to engage an arrestor wire, and created the routine option for aircraft to bolter. By angling the landing area off the ship's axis, thus avoiding obstructions forward of the landing area, aircraft that failed to arrest – that bolter – simply accelerate down the landing area and become airborne again. Bolter aircraft then climb back to landing pattern altitude and sequence in with other landing aircraft to re-attempt the landing. These bolter aircraft are said to be in the "bolter pattern".

The British were the first to describe aircraft that failed to arrest as bolters. When an aircraft bolters on a United States Navy carrier, the Landing Signal Officer (LSO) often transmits "bolter, bolter, bolter" over the radio. United States Navy LSOs grade each carrier landing attempt on a scale of 0–5. Assuming the approach was safe and at least average, a bolter is graded as 2.5. For unsafe or below average approaches that result in bolter, a grade of 2 is assigned.

== See also ==
- Modern US Navy carrier air operations
- Arresting gear
- Tailhook
