= Landing signal officer =

Naval aviation role on aircraft carriers

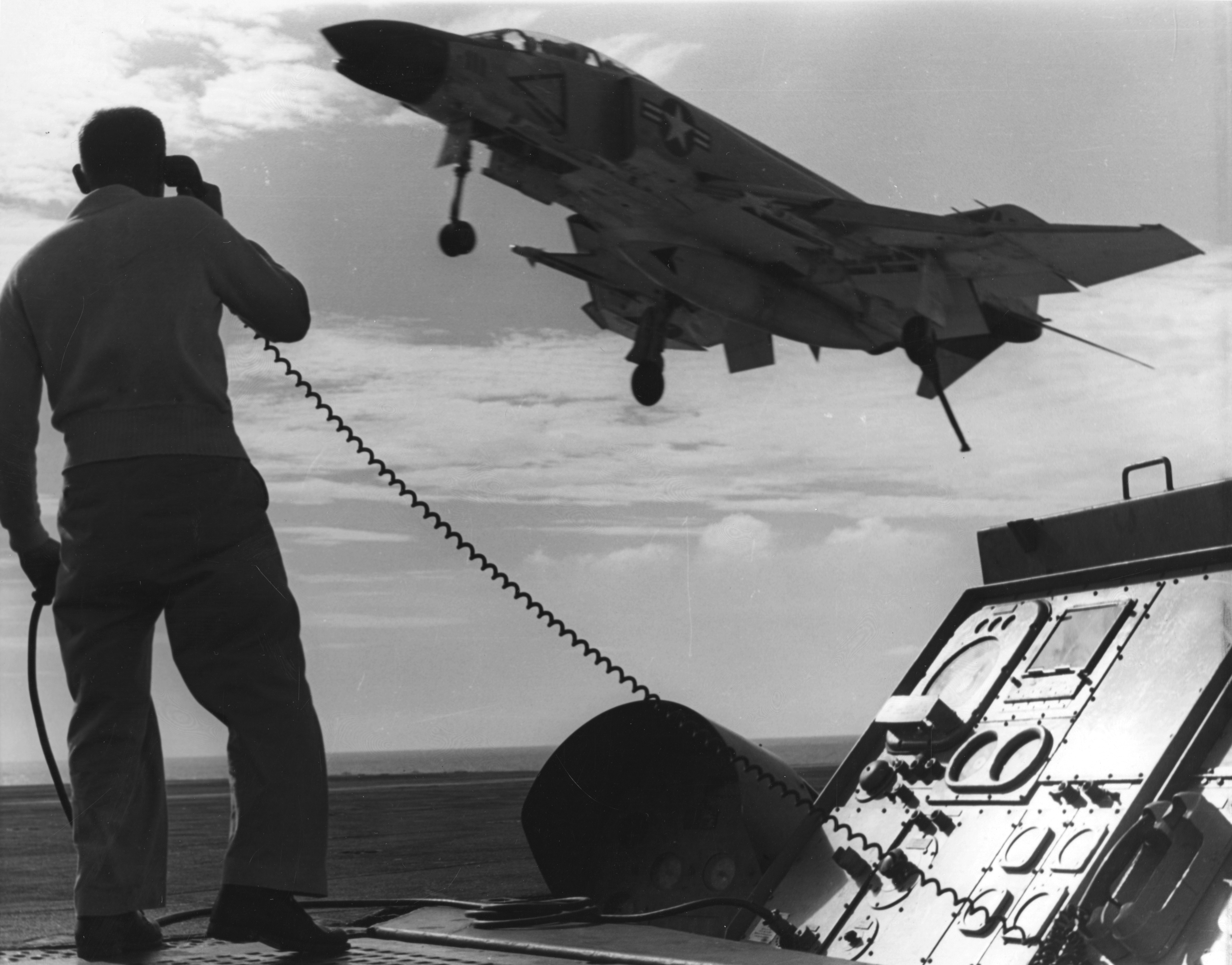
F-4B Phantom of VF-21 returns to USS Midway (CVA-41) off Vietnam in 1965. CAG LSO, LCDR Vern Jumper.

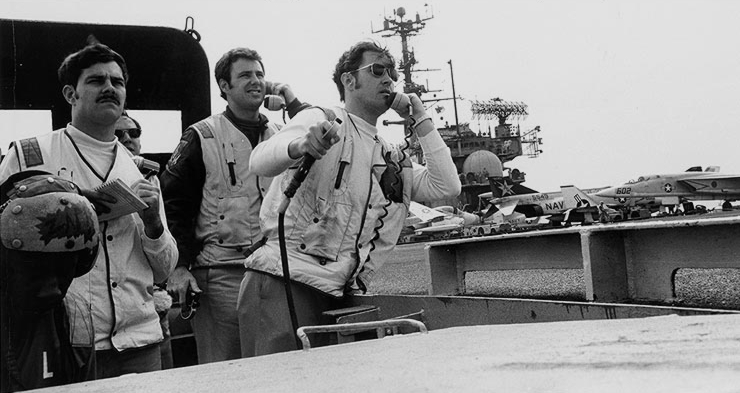
Landing signal officers aboard USS Independence. The LSO platform, in this configuration, was approximately 2.5 feet below flight deck level.

A landing signal officer or landing safety officer (LSO), also informally known as paddles (United States Navy) or batsman (Royal Navy), is a naval aviator specially trained to facilitate the "safe and expeditious recovery" of naval aircraft aboard aircraft carriers. LSOs aboard smaller air capable ships that launch and recover helicopters are also informally known as "paddles." Originally LSOs were responsible for bringing aircraft aboard ship using hand-operated signals. Since the introduction of optical landing systems in the 1950s, LSOs assist pilots by giving information via radio handsets.

== History ==
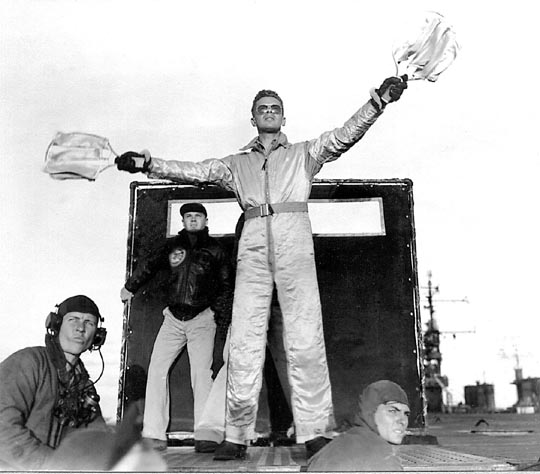
WWII-era LSO using "paddles" to communicate with landing aircraft

In the United States Navy, aircraft carrier operations began with USS Langley (CV-1) in 1922, and it served as a platform to experiment and develop aircraft launch and recovery procedures. The first pilots had no signaling system for assistance from shipboard personnel. Langley's first executive officer, Commander Kenneth Whiting, had a hand-cranked movie camera film every landing to aid in evaluation of landing technique. When not flying, Whiting observed all landings from the aft port corner of the flight deck. Whiting's position remained visible to landing pilots in critical touchdown attitudes when the nose of the aircraft might obscure the pilot's view straight ahead. Pilots found Whiting's body language helpful and suggested an experienced pilot be assigned to occupy that position, using agreed signals which evolved with experience. On one occasion when trying to signal an inexperienced pilot who had missed several approaches by coming in too high, Whiting pioneered the use of paddles or flags by grabbing the white hats of two nearby sailors and holding one in each hand to emphasize his hand positions.

=== Hand-operated signals ===
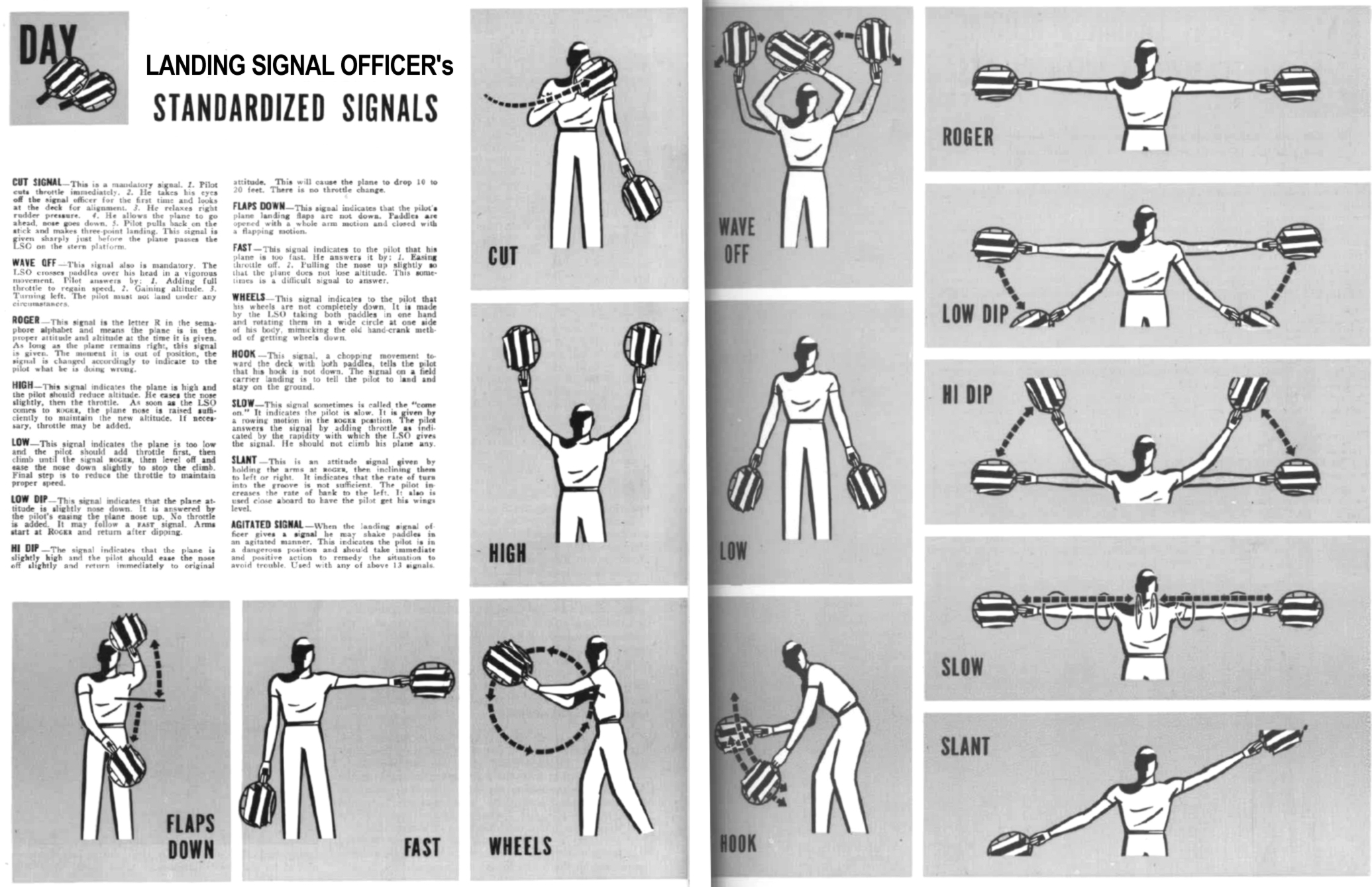
LSOs used flag semaphore prior to adopting paddles for better visibility at greater distance. The basic semaphore signal letters F for fast, N for low, U for high, and R for roger (or "right on") were retained with a few more specialized signals; but the original S for slow was replaced as shown in this illustration of the thirteen standardized LSO signals used by the U.S. Navy during World War II.

From the 1920s into the 1950s, U.S. Navy and Royal Navy LSOs used a variety of signals to assist pilots landing aboard aircraft carriers. The signals provided information on lineup with the deck, height relative to proper glide slope, angle of attack (fast or slow), and whether the plane's tailhook and wheels were down. The final signal was "the cut" (a slashing motion at the throat) ordering the pilot to reduce power and land the aircraft. In a properly executed landing, the aircraft's tailhook snagged an arresting wire that brought the plane to a halt. A "waveoff" was a mandatory order to abort the landing and go around for another attempt. Sometimes a proper approach drew a waveoff if the deck was "fouled" with aircraft or personnel in the landing area.

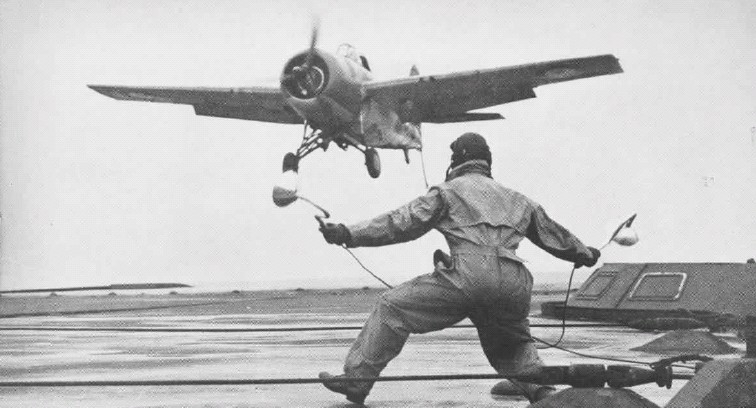
A British LSO aboard HMS Indomitable (92), 1942

LSOs faced the incoming plane and held colored flags for visibility. Because LSOs waved colored paddles, flags, or wands, the officers became unofficially known as "Paddles" in the United States Navy, or "Batsmen" in the Royal Navy, while the trade was referring to as "waving".

=== LSOs in different navies ===
Both the U.S. Navy and Royal Navy employed LSOs. The main difference between American and British LSOs was the nature of their signals. Generally, U.S. Navy signals were advisory, such as indicating whether the plane was on glide slope, too high, or too low. On the other hand, Royal Navy signals were usually mandatory, such as ordering the pilot to add power, or come port. When "crossdecking" (pilots from one navy operating off a carrier of the other), the two navies had to decide whether to use the American or British system. Britain stopped using LSOs in the 1970s when the use of arresting gear and catapults was discontinued (and aircraft shifted to STOVL aircraft such as Harriers).

In contrast, the Imperial Japanese Navy had no LSOs. Instead, its carriers employed a system of colored lights much like today's general aviation runway edge lights at most airports. However, each Japanese carrier assigned a sailor to wave a red flag in case a landing was to be aborted.

=== Optical landing system ===
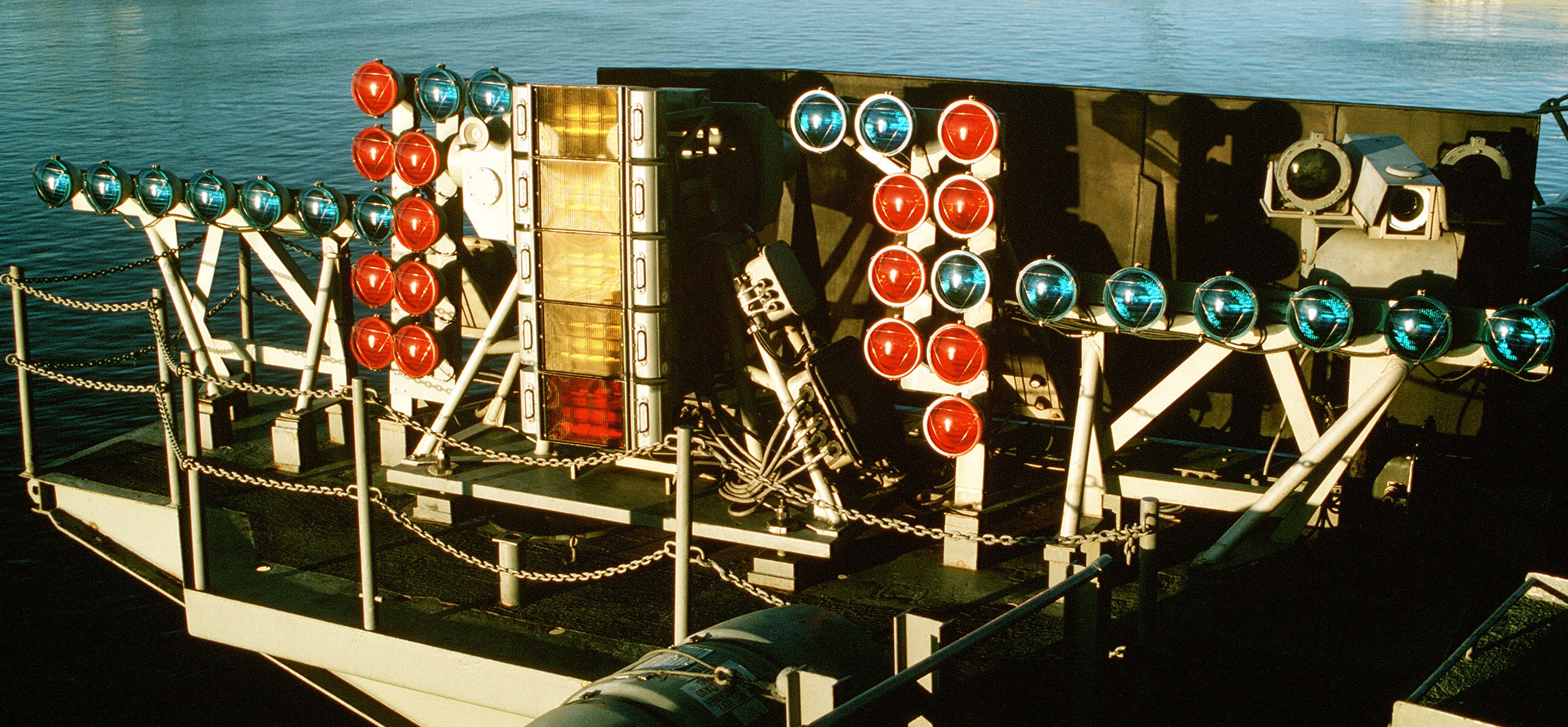
OLS array aboard former USS John F. Kennedy (CV-67)

From the late 1950s, carriers evolved from the original straight or axial-deck configuration into the angled flight deck, with an optical landing system (OLS) providing glide slope information to the pilot. As such, the system of using both the OLS and the LSO was developed.

Together with the OLS, the LSO provides input to the pilot via a radio handset (that looks like a telephone handset), advising of power requirements, position relative to glide path and centerline. The LSO also holds a "pickle" (a handheld switch box) that controls a combination of lights attached to the OLS to indicate "go around" using the bright red, flashing wave off lights. Additional signals, such as "cleared to land", "add power", or "divert" can be signaled using an upper row of green lights called "cut lights", or a combination thereof. Often, pictures of LSOs show them holding the pickle switch over their head. This is done as a visual reminder to the LSOs that the deck is "fouled" – unsafe for an approach, with aircraft, debris, or personnel in the landing area. Once the deck becomes clear, the LSOs are free to lower the pickle.

== USN / USMC LSO qualifications ==
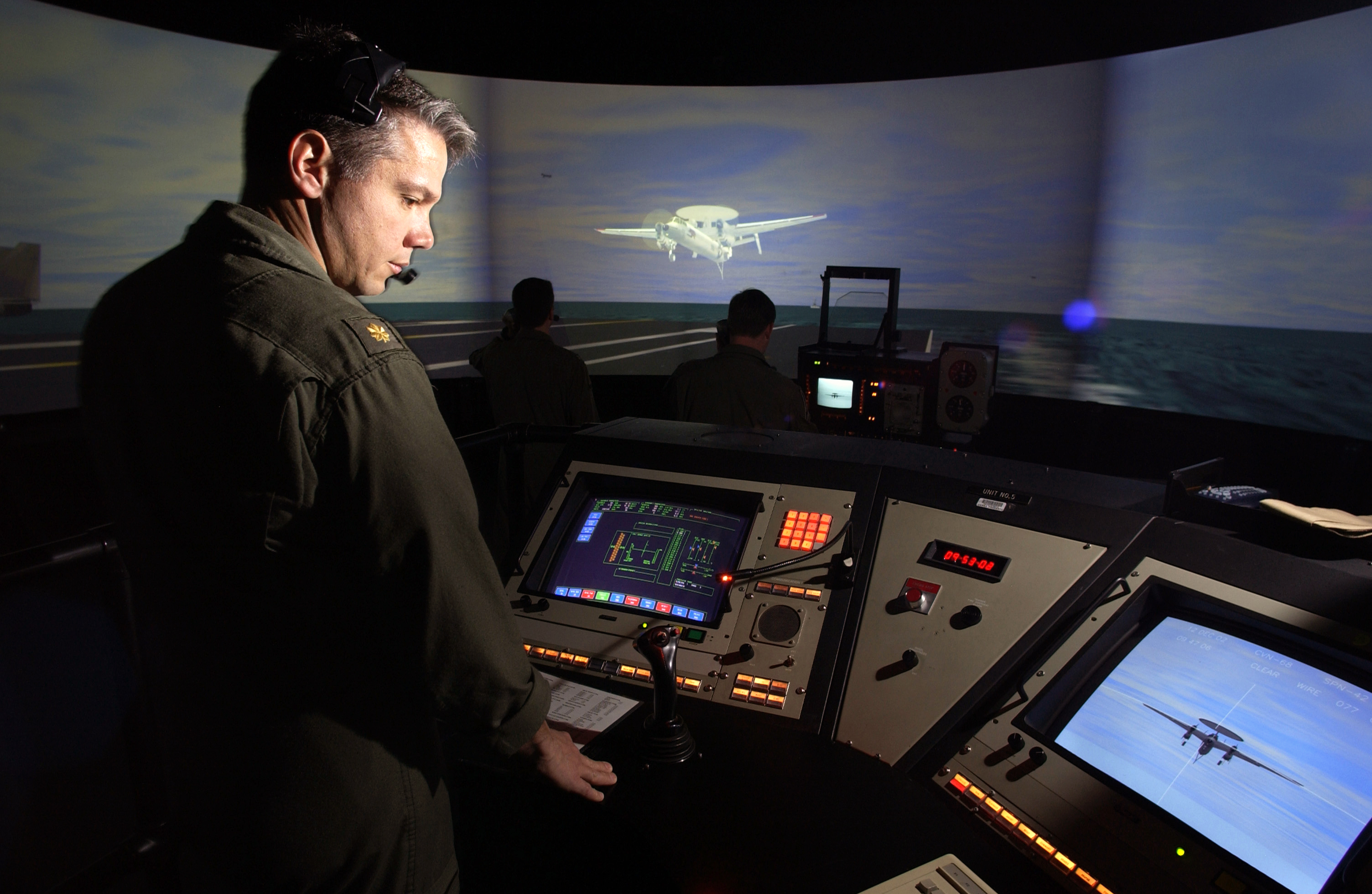
LSO training simulator at NAS Oceana

LSOs have been rated carrier pilots since the end of World War II, but during the war the need was such that some non-aviators were trained. Because of the importance of LSOs, the duty offers great responsibility for junior officers, generally lieutenants (junior grade) to lieutenant commander. Prospective LSOs are selected among junior pilots from each fixed wing USN and USMC carrier aviation squadron. The first qualification they receive is a "field qualification", which allows them to wave aircraft at shore runways during Field Carrier Landing Practice (FCLPs) without supervision. The LSO next attends the LSO School at NAS Oceana, Virginia, for Initial Formal Ground Training. Additional qualifications include:

- Squadron Qualification – LSO qualified to wave his own type aircraft; typically achieved after a full deployment.
- Wing Qualification – LSO qualified to wave all the aircraft types in his carrier air wing or functional air wing; typically achieved after additional deployments. LSO is also qualified and trusted to wave all the type aircraft in any weather condition, day or night. LSO NATOPS requires a Wing Qualified LSO be on the LSO platform for all recoveries.
- Training Qualification – LSO qualified to wave Student Naval Aviators and Fleet Replacement Squadron pilots in their specific type/model/series aircraft.
- Staff Qualification – This qualification is reserved for Air Wing LSOs, the Senior LSO for the air wing. Air Wing LSOs (also known as "CAG Paddles") train and qualify LSOs from squadrons in the Air Wing.
- Force LSO – This is the senior LSO for the fleet, typically assigned to Naval Air Force Atlantic or Naval Air Force Pacific.

== Wave teams ==
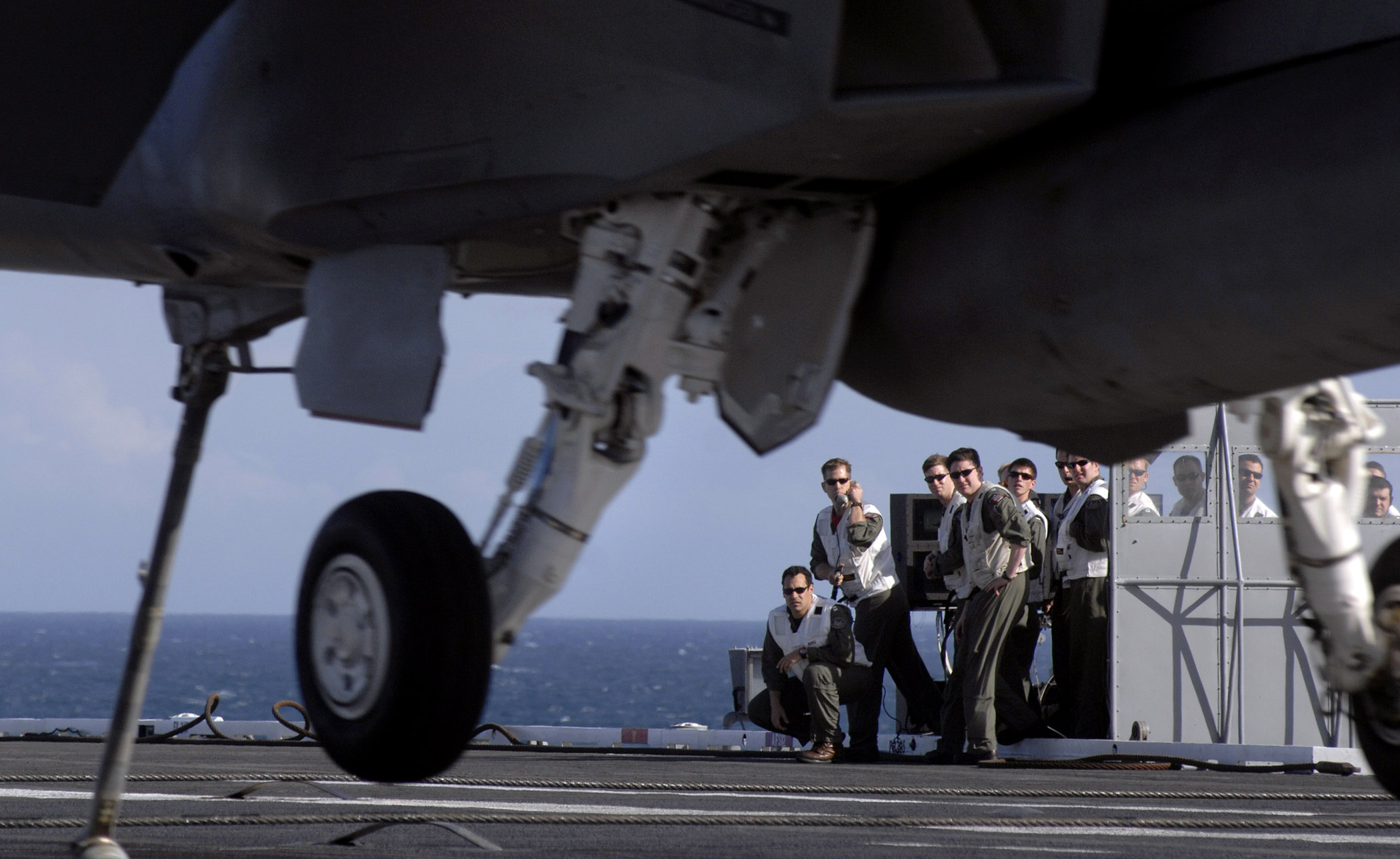
Landing signal officers

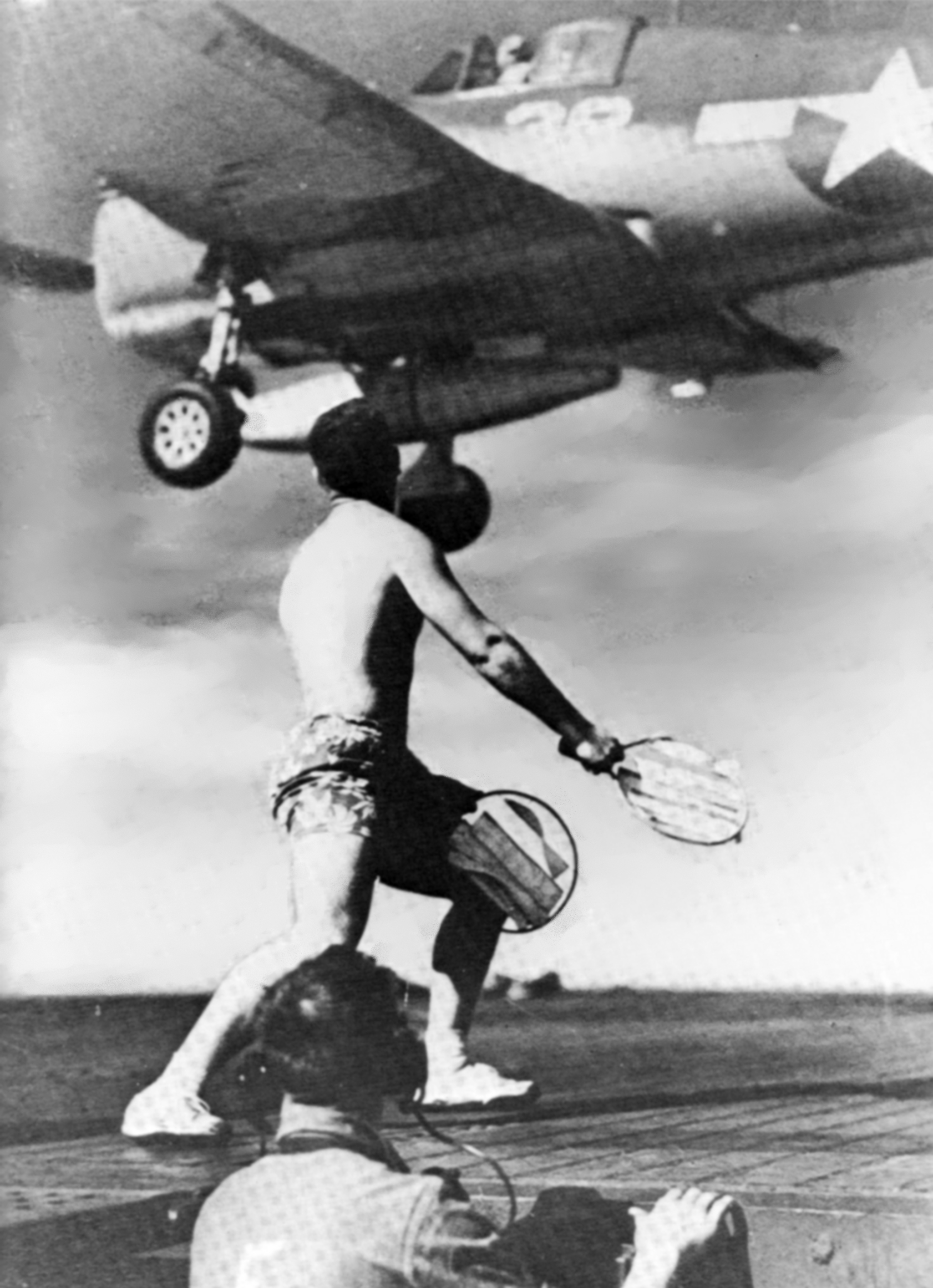
An LSO in casual clothing on USS Yorktown during World War II

=== Air Wing LSO ===
All LSOs work directly for the Air Wing LSO (aka "Cag Paddles"), who is ultimately responsible for the safe and expeditious recovery of aircraft, and for training/qualifying junior LSOs. There are typically two Air Wing LSOs per Air Wing, and one of them is usually on the LSO platform for every landing.

=== Controlling LSO ===
The Controlling LSO is primarily responsible for aircraft glideslope and angle of attack. He or she also issues a "grade" for each landing.

=== Backup LSO ===
The Backup LSO is typically more experienced than the Controlling LSO, and is primarily responsible for aircraft lineup and ensuring that the landing area is clear. He helps in the grading. He may provide glideslope/angle of attack commentary on that grade.

=== Deck status LSO ===
This individual monitors deck status as either "clear" or "foul". Foul deck is further delineated based on what is "fouling" the landing area. With personnel or aircraft in the landing area, the "waveoff window" is adjusted so that approaching aircraft get no lower than 100 feet above the highest obstacle in the landing area. If there is neither personnel nor aircraft in the landing area but the deck is still foul, aircraft must be waved off in time to pass no lower than 10 feet above the landing area.

== LSO equipment ==
=== LSO platform ===
LSOs do their waving from the LSO Platform, which is on the port side of the ship aft of the port side aircraft elevator. It is protected by a wind deflector, and has an escape area into which deck personnel can jump in an emergency. The platform is outfitted with communications gear, deck status and ship indications, as well as controls for the OLS.

=== LSO workstation ===
The LSO work station consists of three pickle switches, a wind screen, the LSO Base Console and a HUD unit, with actual configuration varying dependent on ship type, age and technology.

=== ILARTS ===
Integrated Launch And Recovery Television Surveillance System (ILARTS) provides the LSO with a reference for aircraft lineup and glideslope information during recovery operations, and is used as a debriefing medium for pilots. Additionally, the system is used for recording significant flight deck events and, when necessary, for mishap or incident analysis.

== Grading ==
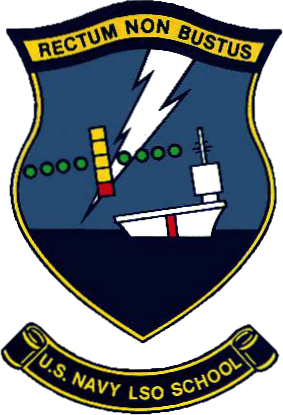
U.S. Navy LSO School insignia.

Every carrier landing made by US pilots is graded for safety and technique, using a complex shorthand to denote what each aircraft did during various phases of each approach. Approaches are divided into parts:

- The 90 – when the aircraft has approximately 90 degrees of turn until lined up with the centerline.
- The Start – generally from when the aircraft crosses the wake and/or the pilot "calls the ball" (picks up the lights of the optical landing system) at around ¾ mile.
- The Middle – from about ½ to ¼ mile.
- In Close – from about ¼ mile to 1/10 mile.
- At the Ramp – from when the aircraft crosses the round-down of the flight deck until touchdown.
- In the Wires – from touchdown until stopped

Deviations from optimal glideslope, centerline, and angle of attack are noted for each phase, resulting in an overall grade, which is debriefed to each pilot by the LSO teams after each cycle. Average grades are computed for each pilot, resulting in a highly competitive pecking order of pilot landing skill throughout the airwing.

Possible grades:

- "OK Underline" – a perfect pass, generally under unfavorable circumstances. Naval Aviators often have hundreds of carrier landings without ever receiving this grade. Worth 5 points.
- "OK" – a pass with only very minor deviations from centerline, glideslope and angle of attack. Worth 4 points.
- "Fair" – a pass with one or more safe deviations and appropriate corrections. Worth 3 points.
- "Bolter" – a safe pass where the hook is down and the aircraft does not stop. Worth 2.5 point, but counts against pilot/squadron/wing "boarding rate".
- "No Grade" – a pass with gross (but still safe) deviations or inappropriate corrections. Failure to respond to LSO calls will often result in this grade. Worth 2 points.
- "Technique Waveoff" – a pass with deviations from centerline, glideslope and/or angle of attack that are unsafe and need to be aborted. Worth 1 point.
- "Cut Pass" – an unsafe pass with unacceptable deviations, typically after a wave off is possible. Worth zero points.
- "Foul Deck Waveoff" – a pass that was aborted due to the landing area being fouled. No points are assigned and the pass is not counted toward the pilot's landing grade average.

The LSOs also write a comment in shorthand for use in the LSO-Pilot debrief. An example comment might read, "High, a little overshooting start, fly through down on comeback in the middle, low in close to at the ramp. Fair-2." This means the aircraft was high at the start of the approach and had slightly overshot the landing area centerline. As the pilot corrected to centerline, he did not add enough power so he flew through the glideslope from high to low. The LSO likely would have given the pilot a signal at this time to add power. For the last portion of the approach, the aircraft remained below glideslope (but was on centerline because of the lack of a comment), touching down prior to the target 3-wire. The pilot caught the 2-wire, and received a grade of "fair".

== Popular culture ==
The LSO in popular culture is romantically represented by "Beer Barrel", the colorful officer in James Michener's best-seller The Bridges at Toko-Ri. Actor Robert Strauss played the role in the 1954 motion picture.

LSOs can be seen aiding in the recovery process of F-14s in the beginning of the 1986 movie Top Gun. They also play an integral part in the 1981 movie The Final Countdown.

The CBS television series JAG features several episodes centering on LSOs.

In Battlestar Galactica, Aaron Kelly serves as the ship's LSO, responsible for the comings and goings of spacecraft.

G.I. Joe produced a 1/6 scale uniform and accessories for the LSO.

In the popular mobile Ubisoft first-person shooter Sniper Fury, many of the missions involve taking down Landing Signal Officers.

== Gallery ==
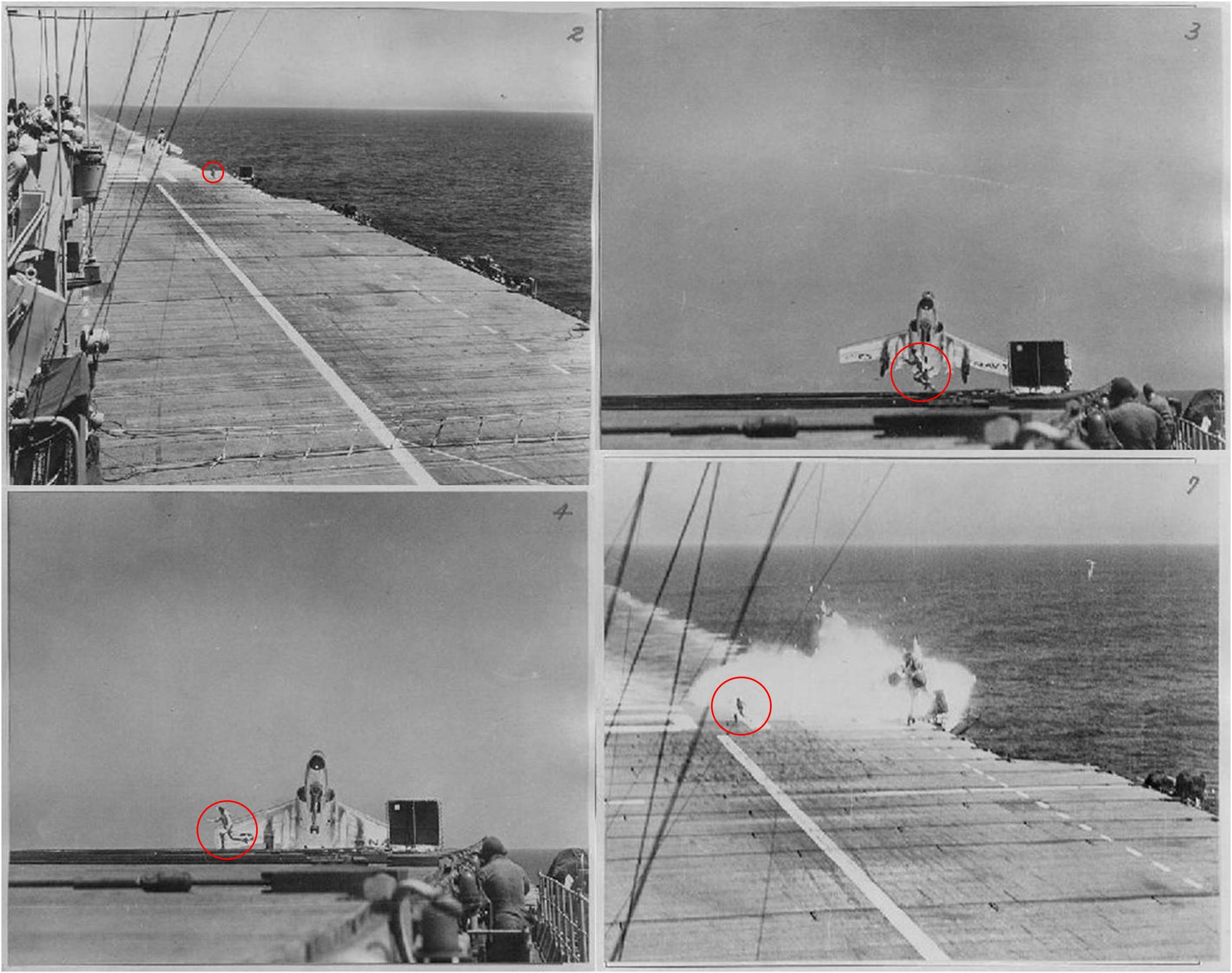
LSO running for cover aboard USS Hancock during an F7U-3 crash, 14 July 1955. The pilot was killed, along with three deck crew who were in the path of the fireball.

== See also ==
- Index of aviation articles
- Aircraft carrier
