= Naval Air Training and Operating Procedures Standardization =

NATOPS Program: USA

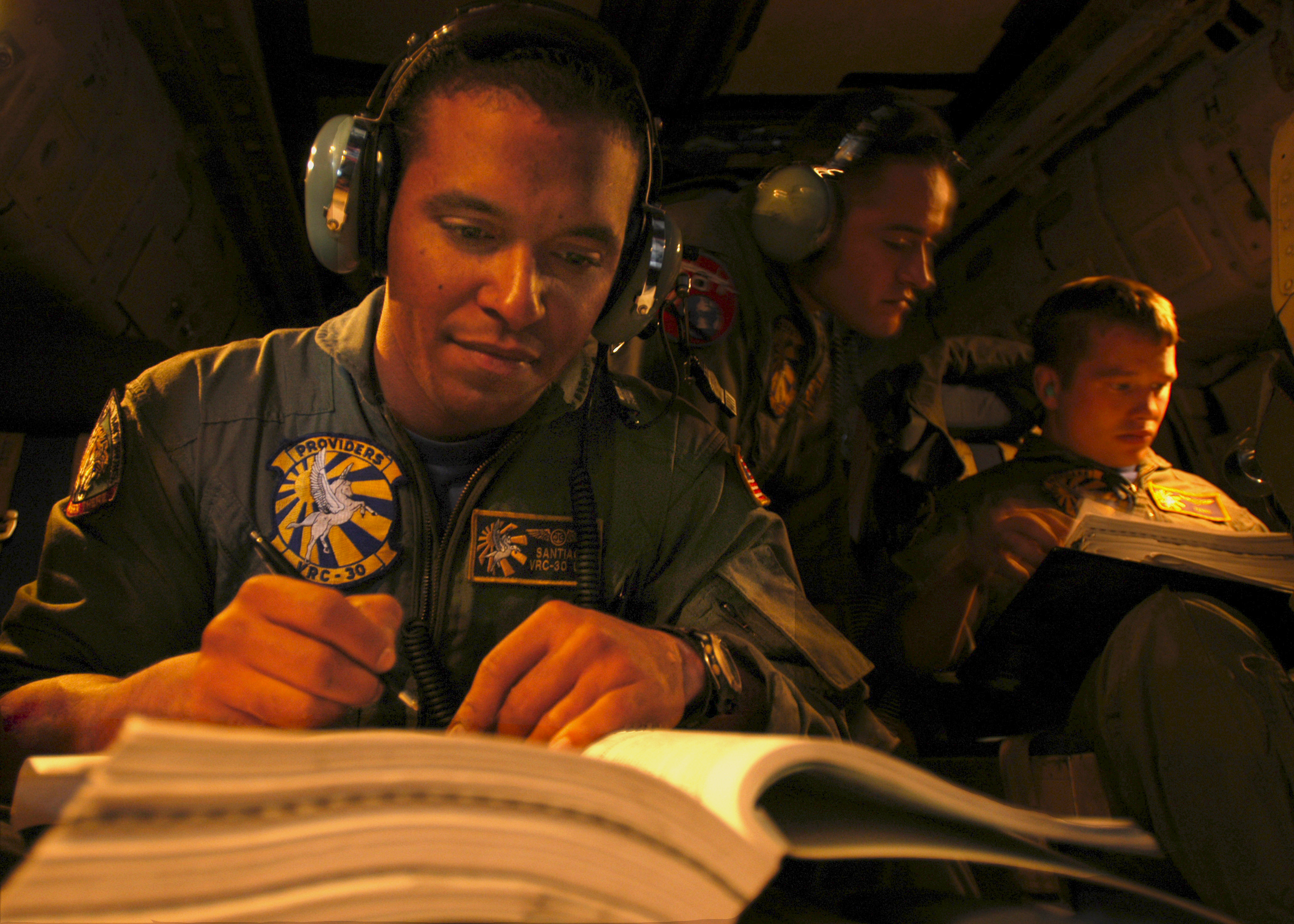
Sailors studying for the NATOPS exam

The Naval Air Training and Operating Procedures Standardization (NATOPS) program (pronounced NAY-Tops) prescribes general flight and operating instructions and procedures applicable to the operation of all United States naval aircraft and related activities. The program issues policy and procedural guidance of the chief of naval operations (CNO) and the commandant of the Marine Corps (CMC) that is applicable to all United States Navy (USN) and United States Marine Corps (USMC) aviation personnel.

Each NATOPS manual for each USN and USMC Type/Model/Series (T/M/S) (Note: T/M/S for USN and USMC aircraft is analogous to the Mission Design Series (MDS) for USAF aircraft.) of aircraft has the following statement:

NATOPS is a positive approach toward improving combat readiness and achieving a substantial reduction in the aircraft accident rate. Standardization, based on professional knowledge and experience, provides the basis for development of an efficient and sound operational procedure. The standardization program is not planned to stifle individual initiative, but rather to aid the commanding officer in increasing the unit's combat potential without reducing command prestige or responsibility.

— OPNAV Instruction 3710.7U

== History/Reason for Being ==
NATOPS was established by the United States Navy in 1961 as a positive approach towards improving combat readiness and achieving a substantial reduction in naval aircraft mishaps in both the U.S. Navy and U.S. Marine Corps.

In 1950, the U.S. Navy and U.S. Marine Corps lost a total of 776 aircraft (roughly two aircraft per day or a rate of 54 major mishaps per 10,000 flight hours). Numerous technical initiatives, including the angled flight deck on aircraft carriers in 1954 and various standardization programs, were credited with significantly reducing the rate to 19 major mishaps per 10,000 flight hours by 1961, and further to nine major mishaps per 10,000 flight hours by 1970 (the current rate, for comparison, is under two major mishaps per 10,000 flight hours).

A lack of standardization and training in both aircraft maintenance and flight operations was cited as a causal factor in a large percentage of mishaps. Several standardization programs were initiated in the late 1950s and early 1960s to counter this problem. The first was the Naval Aviation Maintenance Program (NAMP) in 1959. Prior to the NAMP, aircraft maintenance practices were completely non-standardized across U.S. naval aviation. For example, an aircraft maintenance procedure might be significantly different from one squadron to the next, even though both squadrons operated exactly the same T/M/S aircraft on the same base or in the same air group. The NAMP standardized maintenance procedures across all of naval aviation, or what has been termed since the early 2000s as the entire "naval aviation enterprise".

The second standardization initiative began in 1961 with the introduction of the Fleet Replacement Squadron (FRS) program. The purpose of an FRS is to indoctrinate newly designated aircrew (naval aviators, naval flight officers, enlisted naval aircrewman) and aircraft maintenance personnel into the peculiarities of specific aircraft. Prior to the FRS concept, qualified pilots transitioning to a new aircraft were essentially told how to start it, and then sent to go fly. The final major standardization initiative put in place was the NATOPS program in 1961.

== NATOPS publications ==
NATOPS manuals contain standard flight doctrine and the optimum operating procedures for the aircraft model or aviation activity (e.g., CV NATOPS, LSO NATOPS, etc.) concerned. They do not include tactical doctrine.

There are numerous publications associated with NATOPS covering three basic areas:

- The overarching document establishing the program is Chief of Naval Operations Instruction (OPNAVINST) 3710.7: NATOPS General Flight and Operating Instructions
- Specific aircraft NATOPS flight manuals for each USN and USMC Type/Model/Series (T/M/S) aircraft; these are similar to the Air Force Technical Order "Dash 1" series flight manuals in the U.S. Air Force for each Mission Design Series (MDS) aircraft in USAF service.
- Miscellaneous manuals

=== Compliance ===
Compliance with stipulated manual procedures is mandatory, but deviations are allowed per the following statements found in all NATOPS manuals:

In order to remain effective, NATOPS must be dynamic and stimulate rather than suppress individual thinking. Since aviation is a continuing, progressive profession, it is both desirable and necessary that new ideas and new techniques be expeditiously evaluated and incorporated if proven to be sound. To this end, Commanding Officers of aviation units are authorized to modify procedures contained herein… for the purpose of assessing new ideas prior to initiating recommendations for permanent changes.

—NAVAIR 01-45AAE-1, NATOPS Flight Manual, Navy Models A-7C, A-7E Aircraft

However, [this manual] is not a substitute for sound judgment. Compound emergencies, available facilities, adverse weather or terrain, or considerations affecting the lives and property of others may require modification of the procedures contained herein. Read this manual from cover to cover. It is your responsibility to have a complete knowledge of its contents.

—NAVAIR 01-F14AAA-1, NATOPS Flight Manual, Navy Model F-14A Aircraft

[NATOPS] is not intended to cover every contingency that may arise nor every rule of safety and good practice. To achieve maximum value, the

contents of all directives cited must be studied and understood.

—NATOPS General Flight and Operating Instructions: OPNAV Instruction 3710.7T, page 1-1

=== CNAF 3710.7 ===
The "3710" or "CNAF 3710", as it is commonly referred to, is issued by the Office of the Chief of Naval Operations. Often called the "General NATOPS", it is the overarching document in the NATOPS program and it provides policy and procedural guidance applicable to a broad spectrum of users.

Among a variety of topics, 3710 covers:

- The general scope and purpose of the NATOPS program
- What naval aircraft may be used for and who may pilot and crew them
- Flight demonstrations, authorized airfields, cross-country flights and fuel planning
- Supersonic flight operations and aerobatic flight
- Individual qualifications, including instrument ratings
- Aircrew and aircraft documentation requirements

=== Specific aircraft manuals ===
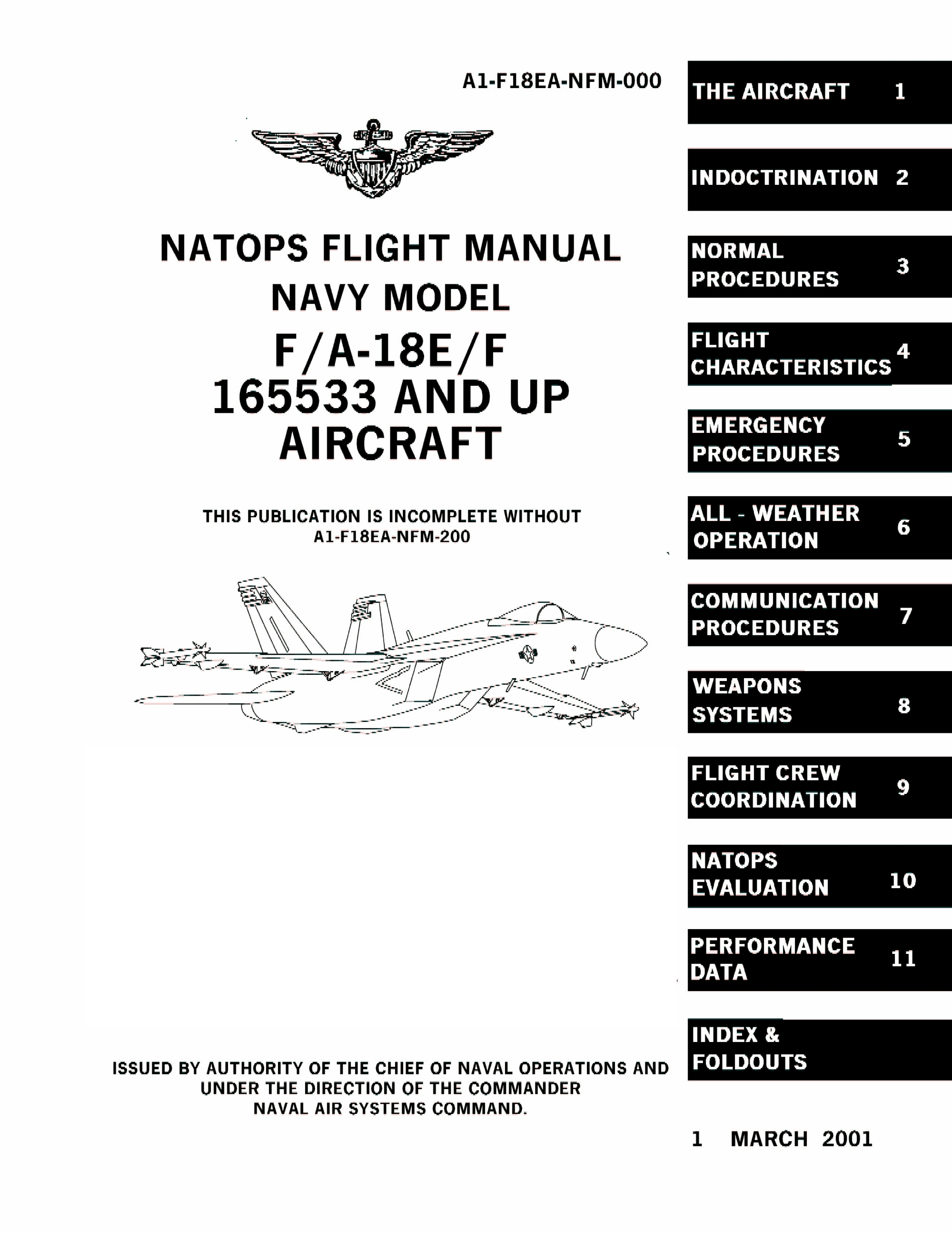
Aircraft specific NATOPS manual cover. These manuals are typically about 2 inches thick.

These are manuals for specific aircraft models containing standardized ground and flight operating procedures, training requirements, aircraft limitations, and technical data necessary for safe and effective operation of the aircraft. There are typically several volumes, including supplements for weapons systems, performance charts, servicing checklist, and post maintenance functional checkflight checklist.

Pocket checklists (or "PCL") contain pertinent extracts from the main publications necessary to normal operations, emergency procedures, and training.

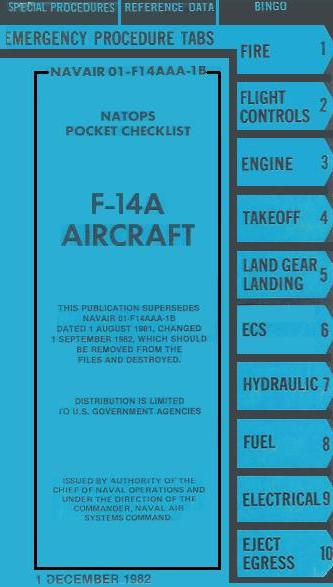
Pocket checklists are designed for quick access to information in the cockpit.

NATOPS flight manuals are prepared using a concept that provides the aircrew with information for operation of the aircraft, but detailed operation and interaction is not provided. This concept was selected for a number of reasons: reader interest increases as the size of a technical publication decreases, comprehension increases as the technical complexity decreases, and accidents decrease as reader interest and comprehension increase. To implement this streamlined concept, observance of the following rules was attempted:

1. The pilot, NFO or enlisted naval aircrewman is considered to have above-average intelligence and normal (average) common sense.
2. No values (pressure, temperature, quantity, etc.) which cannot be read in the cockpit are stated, except where such use provides the pilot with a value judgment. Only the information required to fly the aircraft is provided.
3. Multiple failures (emergencies) are not covered.
4. Simple words in preference to more complex or quasi-technical words are used and, unnecessary and/or confusing word modifiers are avoided.

=== Miscellaneous manuals ===
Miscellaneous NATOPS manuals are issued for special aircraft-related operations or systems that require fleet-wide standardization.

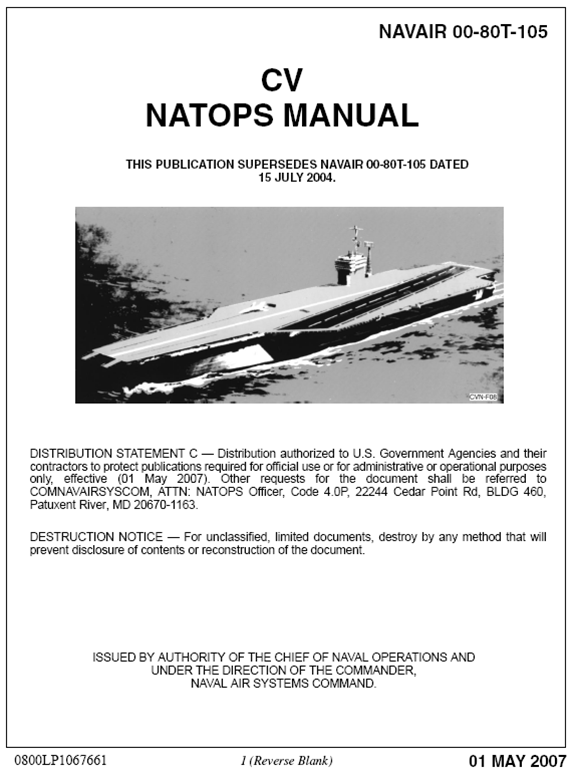
CV NATOPS Manual with distribution notice.

They include:

- Air traffic control
- Air-to-air refueling
- Ground refueling
- Aircraft signals
- Carrier operations (CV NATOPS Manual)
- Air-capable ship operations
- Amphibious assault ship (LHA/LHD) operations
- Flight deck/hangar deck operations
- Instrument flight rules
- Landing signal officer procedures
- Weapons
- Crash and salvage

=== Publication changes ===
Changing NATOPS publications requires following a full approval process. Changes can be rapidly accomplished for urgent/safety of flight issues (via electronic directive to make pen and ink modifications to publications/procedures). There is also an annual conference for manual users (aircrew, maintenance personnel, engineers, policy makers, etc.) do deal with more routine/less urgent matters. These conferences produce a list of "recommended changes" that are then vetted by an approval process prior to promulgation.

== Key people ==
The key people involved in NATOPS go from the Chief of Naval Operations all the way down to individual users.

- NATOPS model manager: The unit commander designated to administer the NATOPS program for a specific aircraft model or aircraft related system. NATOPS model managers conduct annual NATOPS evaluations of units assigned.
- NATOPS program manager: An officer assigned by the NATOPS model manager who performs administrative responsibilities for the NATOPS program for a given T/M/S aircraft, operational system, or training/support system and who is given written authority to act on behalf of the NATOPS model manager in NATOPS-related matters. The NATOPS program manager is highly qualified in his/her aircraft or activity.
- NATOPS evaluator: A highly qualified air crewmember assigned to a NATOPS evaluation unit who conducts annual unit NATOPS evaluations for a given flight crew position. NATOPS evaluators are former NATOPS instructors at the fleet squadron level, typically assigned to a "NATOPS training team" embedded within a given Fleet Replacement Squadron and answering to the NATOPS program manager.
- NATOPS instructor: A highly qualified air crewmember whose primary or secondary duty within an operational fleet squadron, training command squadron, or air test & evaluation squadron is administering the NATOPS evaluation program by conducting positional upgrade and/or annual periodic check rides of flight crew personnel for specific flight crew positions in a given aircraft within that squadron or unit. This position is analogous to a unit flight crew standardization/evaluation (Stan/Eval) pilot, navigator/combat systems officer, air battle manager or enlisted aircrewman in a USAF flying wing.
- Unit NATOPS officer: A naval aviator or naval flight officer whose primary duty is to administer the NATOPS program within a squadron or unit. The NATOPS officer may also be a NATOPS instructor.

== Implementing NATOPS ==
The standard operating procedures prescribed in NATOPS manuals represent the optimum methods of operating various aircraft and related equipment. The NATOPS evaluation is intended to evaluate individual and unit compliance by observing and grading adherence to NATOPS procedures.

=== Individual NATOPS evaluation ===
==== Flight evaluation ====
Individual pilots, flight officers or crewmembers are evaluated when initially qualifying (or requalifying after a non-flying assignment) in a given T/M/S aircraft, and a minimum of annually thereafter. Flight crews may also be evaluated prior to annually as part of a unit NATOPS evaluation administered by NATOPS evaluators. NATOPS exams consist of an open book examination, a closed book examination, an oral examination, and an evaluation flight or simulator check. Use of operational flight trainers (OFTs) / weapons system trainers (WSTs) is encouraged for simulated emergencies and scenarios that present significantly increased risk when actually performed in an aircraft. If no such flight simulator / training device is available, aircraft may be used. Evaluation flights in aircraft that require simulated emergencies are avoided.

==== Ground evaluation ====
Prior to commencing the evaluation flight, an evaluee must achieve a minimum grade of qualified on both open book and closed book NATOPS examinations. The oral examination is also part of the ground evaluation, but may be conducted as part of the flight evaluation.

=== Unit NATOPS evaluation ===
A unit NATOPS evaluation is conducted for every squadron/unit every 18 months by the appropriate NATOPS evaluator(s). The unit NATOPS evaluation includes NATOPS evaluations for each crew position (ground evaluation and an evaluation flight) selected at random by the evaluator to measure overall adherence to NATOPS procedures. NATOPS evaluators will re-evaluate all squadron NATOPS Instructors during a unit NATOPS evaluation and will also select one flight crewmember from each aircraft position at random for a flight or simulator evaluation. For random evaluation check selectees who perform well beyond expectations, NATOPS evaluators may recommend to the squadron commanding officer that the individual be tracked for qualification and designation as a NATOPS instructor.

== See also ==
- Modern United States Navy carrier air operations
- United States Naval Aviator
