= Tailhook =

Aircraft device which allows arrested landings on aircraft carriers

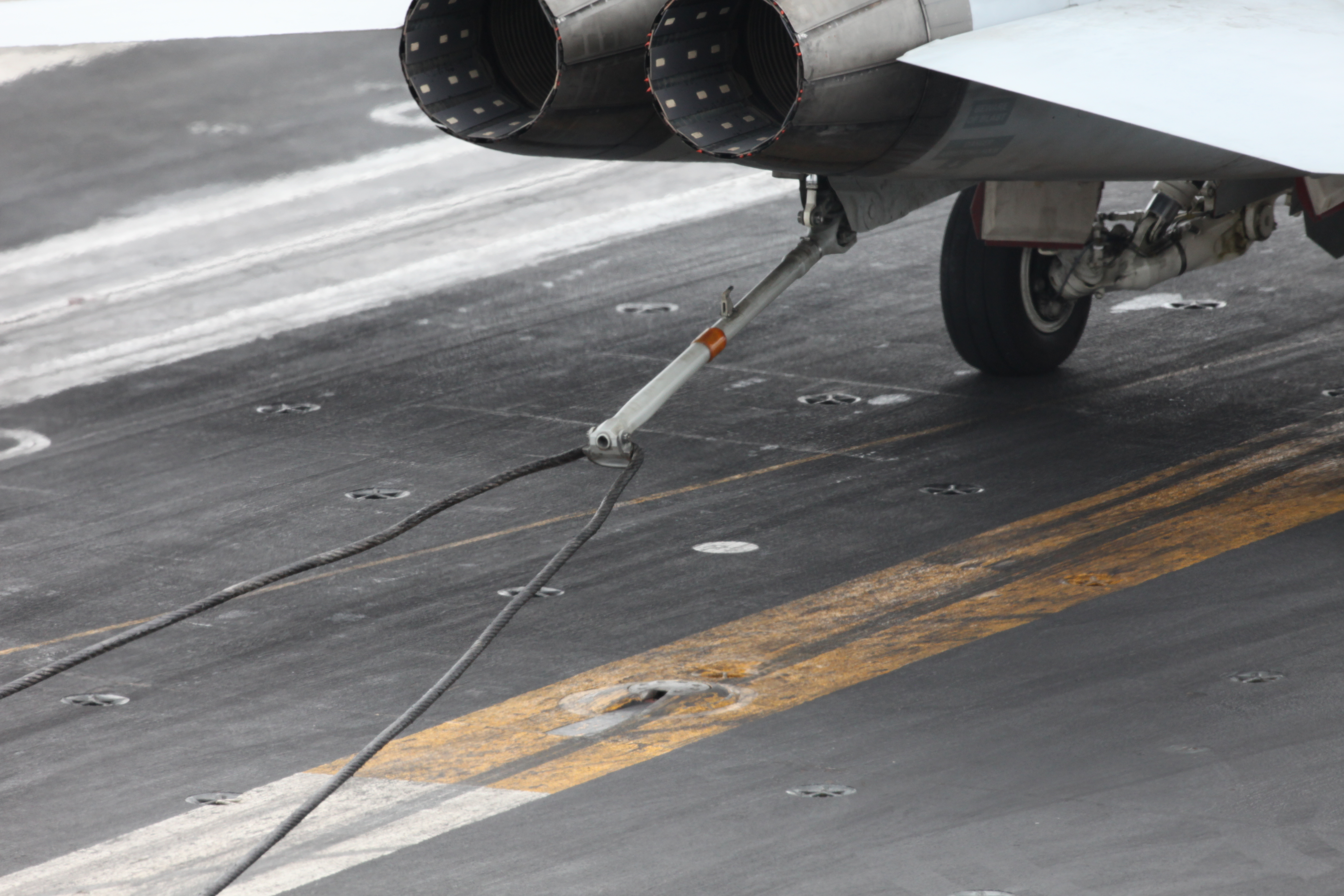
Aircraft's tail hook catching the wire while landing on an aircraft carrier

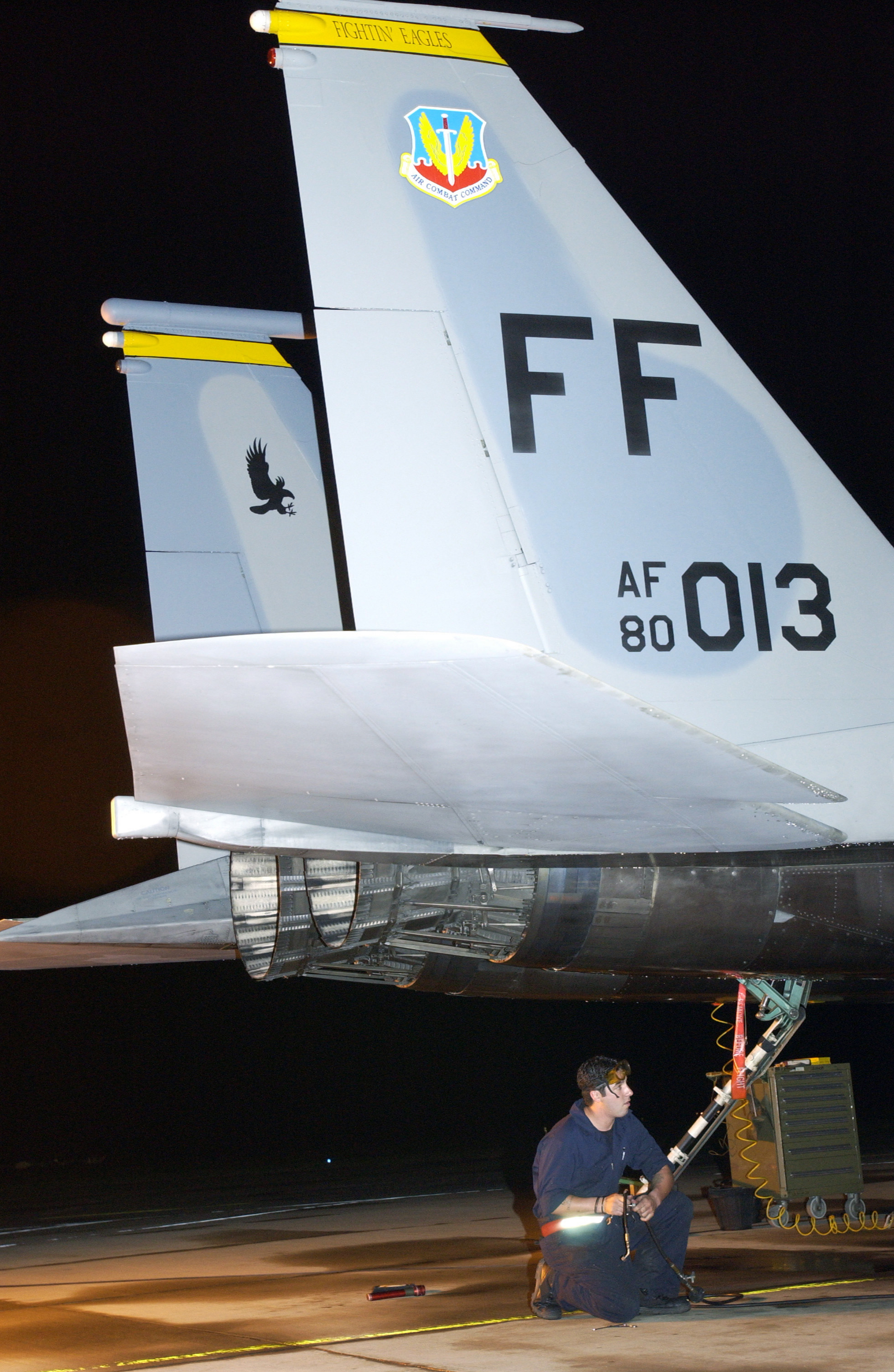
F-15 tailhook. Most USAF tactical jet aircraft have tailhooks for emergency use.

A tailhook, arresting hook, or arrester hook is a device attached to the tail of some military fixed-wing aircraft. The hook is used to achieve rapid deceleration during routine landings aboard aircraft carrier flight decks at sea, or during emergency landings or aborted takeoffs at properly equipped airports.

The tailhook was first demonstrated at sea on 18 January 1911 by the aviator Eugene Ely, having successfully landed aboard the armored cruiser USS Pennsylvania with the aid of the device. It was not until the early 1920s that a practical system, paired with deck-mounted arresting gear, was devised and put into use. During the 1930s, numerous vessels were thus equipped, permitting the use of increasingly heavy combat aircraft at sea during the Second World War. Following the introduction of jet-powered aircraft during the 1950s, arrestor technology was further advanced to permit aircraft operating at greater speeds and weights to land aboard aircraft carriers. The system has continued to see widespread use into the twenty-first century.

== History ==
F/A-18C tailhook with arresting wire

On 18 January 1911, the aviator Eugene Ely flew his Curtiss pusher airplane from the Tanforan airfield in San Bruno, California, and landed on a platform on the armored cruiser USS Pennsylvania anchored in San Francisco Bay, in the first recorded shipboard landing of an aircraft. This flight was also the first ever to use a tailhook system, which had been both designed and built by the circus performer and aviator Hugh Robinson. Following the flight, Ely remarked to a reporter that: "It was easy enough. I think the trick could be successfully turned nine times out of ten." Roughly four months later, the United States Navy would requisition its first airplane, an occasion often viewed as a milestone of naval aviation.

While the system initially drew only limited attention, there was greater recognition of its merits following the outbreak of the First World War. Naval planners acknowledged that, in order for airplanes to be viable naval assets, they would have to be able to both take off from and land on ships. During the Great War, the number of aviators of the United States Navy rose from 38 to 1,650, which engaged in numerous duties in support of the Allies, specialising in combat air patrols and submarine spotting. The capabilities of naval aviation expanded greatly during the late 1910s and early 1920s. The first practical tail hook and arrestor gear arrangement was devised during this time; on 1 April 1922, the US Navy issued a request for the design of an arresting gear to equip a pair of aircraft carriers, the USS Lexington and USS Saratoga.

During early 1930, the US Navy began development of an adjustable hydraulic-based arresting gear arrangement, which proved capable of absorbing the energy of aircraft landing not only at higher speeds but greater weights as well. As military aircraft continued to grow in terms of both weight and sortie rates during the Second World War, naval air wings were compelled to continue innovating and improving their aircraft recovery systems. Throughout the 1950s, as a consequence of the introduction of jet aircraft to operations aboard aircraft carriers, both the landing speeds and tailhook loads increased substantially.

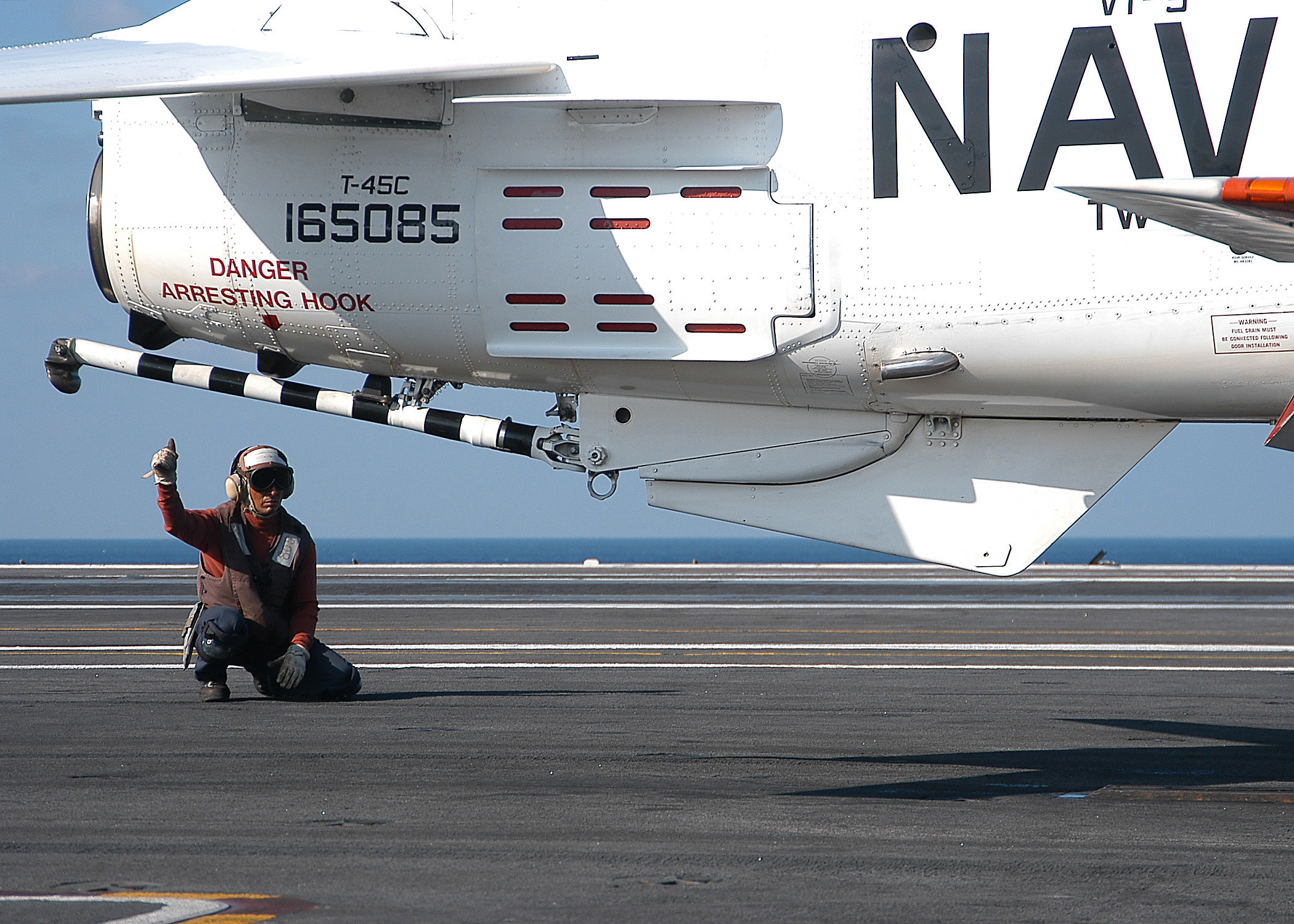
The tailhook of a T-45

The US Navy developed and operated a test rig throughout the 1950s, consisting of a car, guided by a concrete I-beam and propelled by a pair of jet engines. At the end of a one-mile run, the tailhook under test would engage an arresting wire, while the I-beam guide gradually widened to slow down the test car after it passed the arresting wire, acting as a safeguard in the event of arrestor failure. The test rig was capable of simulating different aircraft weights and speeds, the former being adjusted by adding or subtracting steel plates that were loaded onto the modified car. During 1958, further testing took place using an arrangement of four Allison J33 turbojet engines. These trials supported efforts to develop increasingly effective arrestor gear that was suited for the larger and more powerful jets entering naval aviation at that time.

While the tailhook is predominantly operated in a naval context, numerous land-based aircraft have also been fitted with them to assist with slowing down landings during emergencies. One highly unorthodox incident, known as "Pardo's Push", occurred during the Vietnam War in March 1967, involving a United States Air Force McDonnell Douglas F-4 Phantom II piloted by Bob Pardo assisting a second heavily damaged Phantom II in exiting the combat zone by pushing his aircraft against the other's deployed tailhook, reportedly halving its rate of descent temporarily.

In the twenty-first century, the tailhook has remained a part of the principal means of landing aircraft at sea for several navies, including the US Navy. During the 2000s, the Dassault Rafale, a French multirole fighter, became the only non-US fighter type cleared to operate from the decks of US carriers, using catapults and their arresting gear, as demonstrated in 2008 when six Rafales from Flottille 12F integrated into the USS Theodore Roosevelt Carrier Air Wing interoperability exercise. During the 2010s, new software trialled with the Boeing F/A-18E/F Super Hornet fighter reportedly showed promise in simplifying carrier landings.

During flight testing of the new Lockheed Martin F-35 Lightning II, one of the serious deficiencies that necessitated redesigns and delays was the failure of the navy's F-35C variant to catch the arresting wire in all eight landing tests; the tail hook had to be redesigned over a two-year period. Deficiencies have also been identified with the land-based F-35A's emergency tailhook. On 3 November 2014, the first successfully arrested landing of the F-35C was performed.

== Description and operation ==
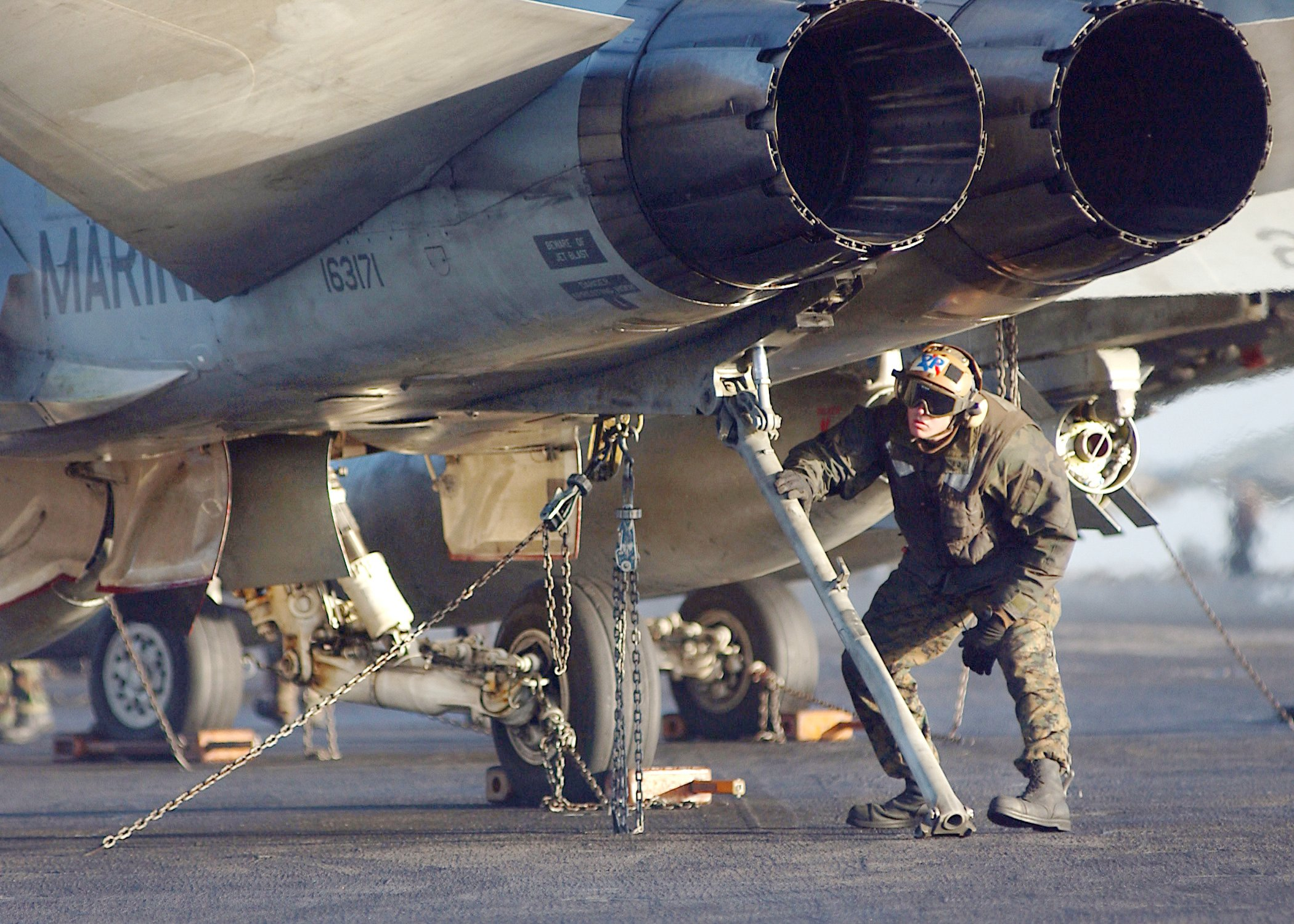
Man inspecting an F/A-18 tailhook prior to launch

The tailhook is a strong metal bar, with its free end flattened out, thickened somewhat, and fashioned into a claw-like hook. The hook is mounted on a swivel on the keel of the aircraft, and is normally mechanically and hydraulically held in the stowed/up position. Upon actuation by the pilot, hydraulic or pneumatic pressure lowers the hook to the down position. The presence of a tailhook is not evidence of an aircraft's aircraft carrier suitability. Carrier aircraft hooks are designed to be quickly raised by the pilot after use.

A large number of land-based fighters are also outfitted with tailhooks, which are intended for use in case of a brake/tire malfunctions, aborted takeoffs, or other emergencies. Land-based aircraft landing gear and tailhooks are typically not strong enough to absorb the impact of a carrier landing, and some land-based tailhooks are held down with nitrogen pressure systems that must be recharged by ground personnel after actuation.

=== Arresting gear ===
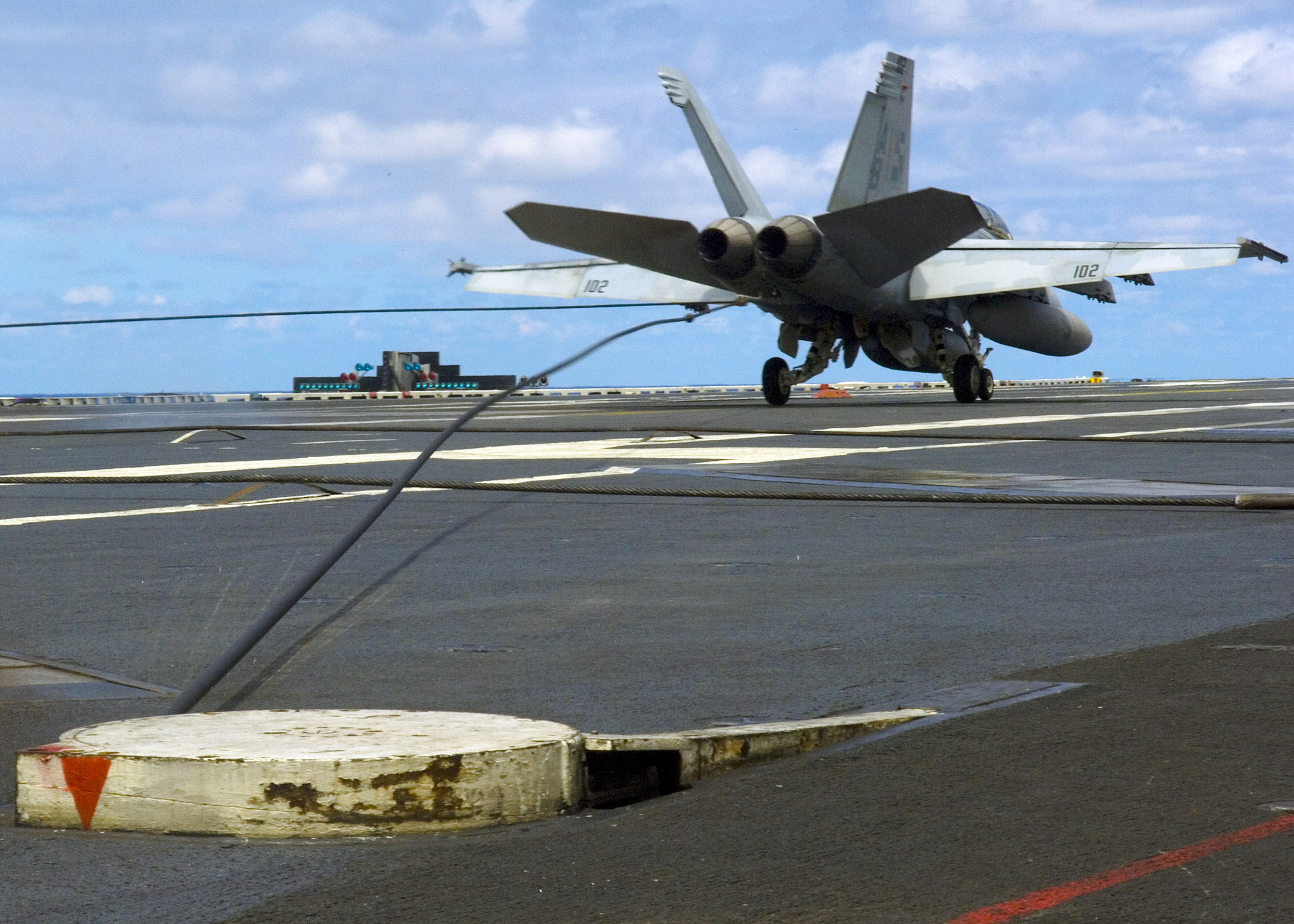
An F/A-18 makes an arrested landing aboard a US aircraft carrier

Both carrier- and land-based arresting gear consists of one or more cables (aka “arresting wires” or “cross deck pendants”) stretched across the landing area and attached on either end to arresting gear engines through “purchase cables”. In a typical carrier deck configuration, a total of four arrestor wires are present. The tailhook's function is to snag one of these cables, preferably the third of the four available, in order that the resistance provided by the arrestor gear can be conveyed to the aircraft, enabling it to decelerate more rapidly.

=== Method ===
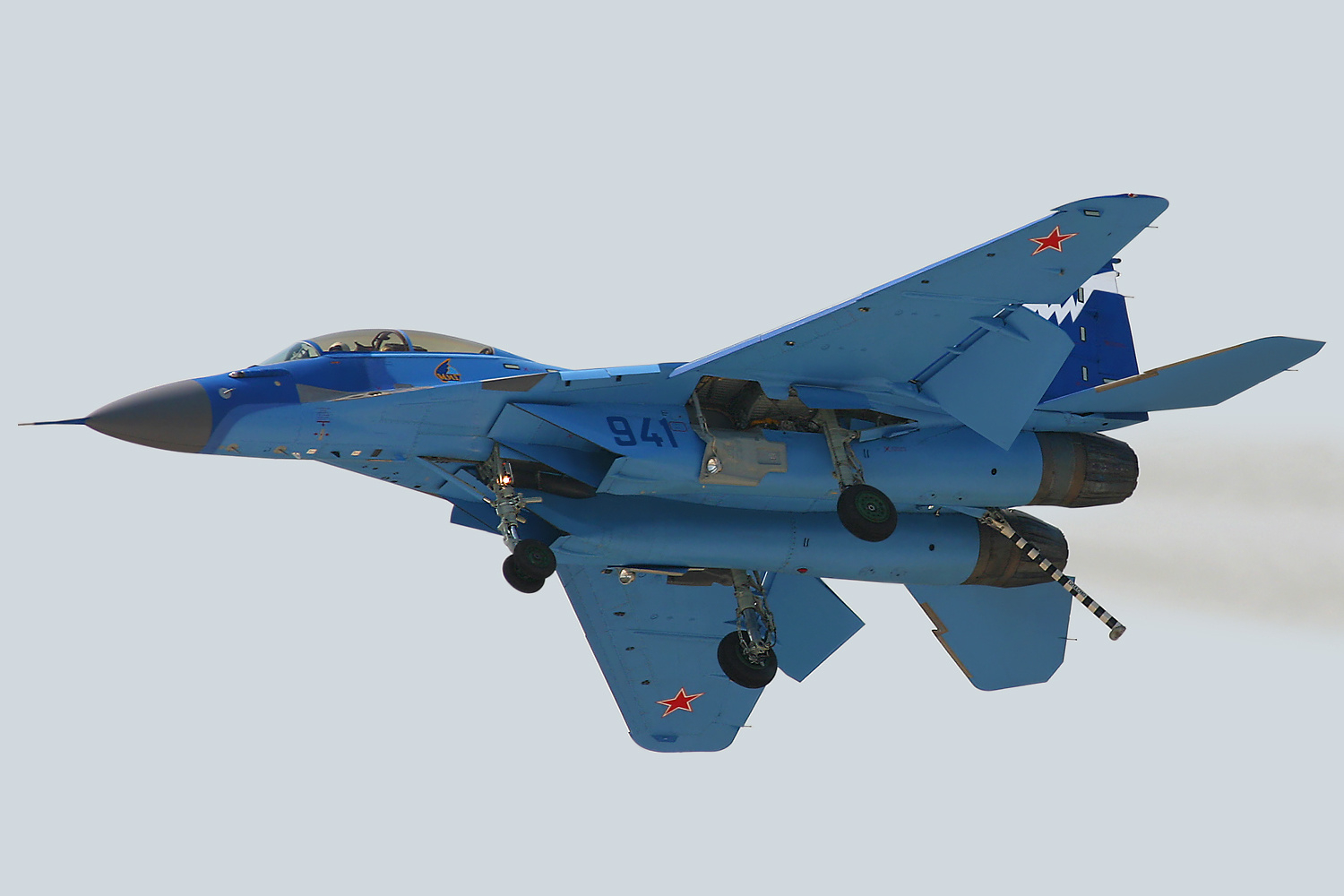
MiG-29K with hook down

Prior to making an "arrested landing", the pilot lowers the hook so that it will contact the ground as the aircraft wheels touch down. The hook then drags along the surface until an arresting cable, stretched across the landing area, is engaged. The cable lets out, transferring the energy of the aircraft to the arresting gear through the cable. A "trap" is often-used slang for an arrested landing. An aircraft which lands beyond the arresting cables is said to have "boltered." Occasionally, the tailhook bounces over one or more of the wires, resulting in a "hook skip bolter."

In the case of an aborted land-based takeoff, the hook can be lowered at some point (typically about 1000 feet) prior to the cable. Should a tailhook of an aircraft become inoperative or damaged, naval aviators have limited options: they can divert to shore-based runways if any are within range, or they can be "barricaded" on the carrier deck by a net that can be erected.

== See also ==
- Arresting gear
- Carrier-based aircraft
- List of active United States naval aircraft
- List of United States Navy aircraft designations (pre-1962)
- Brodie landing system
- Military aviation
- Modern United States Navy carrier air operations
- NATOPS
- Naval aviation
- Naval aviator (United States)
- United States Marine Corps Aviation
