= John Campbell Mitchell =

Scottish artist

John Campbell Mitchell RSA
- Born: John Mitchell; December 1, 1861; Campbeltown, Scotland
- Died: February 15, 1922 (aged 60); Corstorphine Hill, Edinburgh, Scotland
- Known for: Landscape painter
- Style: Broad open views
- Spouse: Mary Agnes Mitchell
- Children: Lt John Patrick Campbell Mitchell; Colin Campbell Mitchell

John Campbell Mitchell ARSA (1861 – 15 February 1922) was a late 19th and early 20th century Scottish landscape artist. He specialised in broad open views such as moorland or beaches.

== Life ==
He was born 'John Mitchell on Shore Street in Campbeltown in western Scotland on 1 December 1861 to John Mitchell (d.1896), a local grocer, and his wife, Janet McMillan (1836–1920). He adopted the name Campbell in later life, probably in reference to his place of birth. His maternal grandfather, Malcolm McMillan, owned the "Steamboat Inn" in Campbeltown. He attended Campbeltown Grammar School until around 1872.

He was apprenticed as a lawyer to the local (and still extant) firm of C & D MacTaggart. However, the local artist William McTaggart actively encouraged him to pursue art, and in the summer of 1874 he joined The Trustees Academy in Edinburgh to retrain as an artist. He began exhibiting at the Royal Scottish Academy in 1886.

In 1887 he went to Paris to study under Jean-Joseph Benjamin-Constant, returning to Edinburgh in 1890. He presumably lived with his father, who had retired to Edinburgh in 1889 and was living at 151 Bruntsfield Place, then a very new and exclusive flat, and exceptionally larger than the average property.

In 1901 he spent several months in Galloway in south-west Scotland studying the ever-changing skies. In 1903 he settled in Corstorphine in west Edinburgh, remaining there for the rest of his life.

He was elected ARSA in 1904 and full RSA in 1919.

He died at home, Duncree on Clermiston Road on Corstorphine Hill in western Edinburgh on 15 February 1922.

John Campbell Mitchell is buried in the churchyard of Gogar Parish Church, Edinburgh

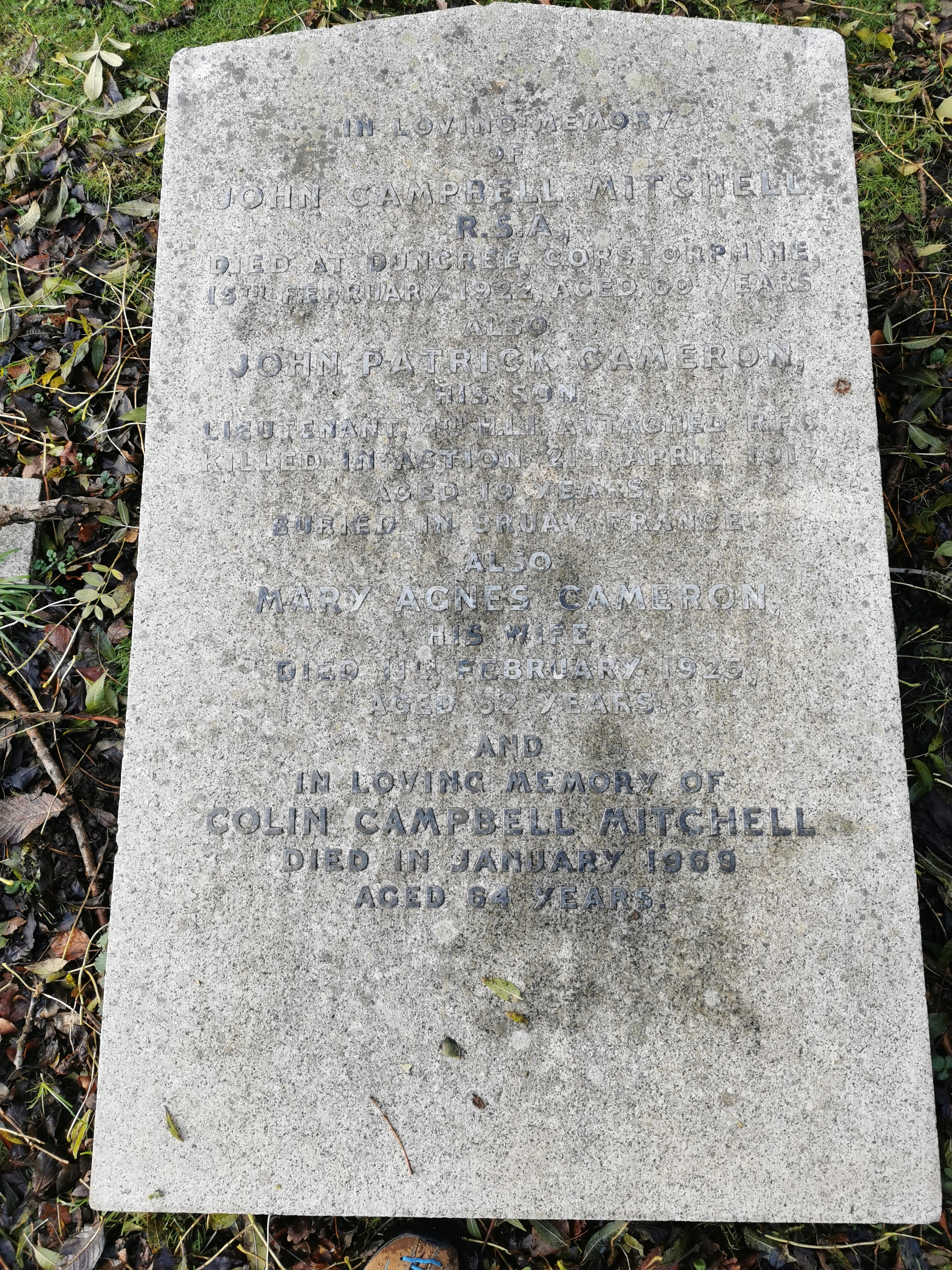
John Campbell Mitchell's Gravestone, Gogar Parish Church, Edinburgh

== Known works ==
- Near Carradale (1885)
- The Haunt of the Curlew Hunter Gallery, stirling
- At the Close of the Day Manchester Art Gallery
- Aberlady, East Lothian Aberdeen Art Gallery and Museum
- The Waterfoot, Carradale (1919) Royal Scottish Academy
- Cruachan Glasgow Museum
- The Argyllshire Moor Nottingham Museum and Art Gallery
- Drifting Clouds Lotherton Hall
- On the Kintyre Hills (1905) Burnet Building, Campbeltown
- On the Kintyre Coast Wellington, New Zealand
- Spring in Midlothian Walker Art Gallery, Liverpool
- Sunset, Machrihanish
- Ebbing Tide, Cramond
- Perthshire Landscape
- Galloway Landscape
- Stormy Sunset at Aberfoyle
- North Berwick from Leithies
- Bass Rock
- The Brown Loch Private collection
- Boats By The Sea, Private Collection, Florida, USA

== Family ==
He was married to Mary Agnes Mitchell.

His eldest son, Lt John Patrick Campbell Mitchell, was killed whilst serving in the Royal Flying Corps in the First World War on 21 April 1917 during the Second Battle of Arras. He was only 19. He is buried in Bruay Communal Cemetery Extension.

Mitchell's younger son was the military scientist, Colin Campbell Mitchell.
