= Aircraft catapult =

Device used to launch aircraft from ships

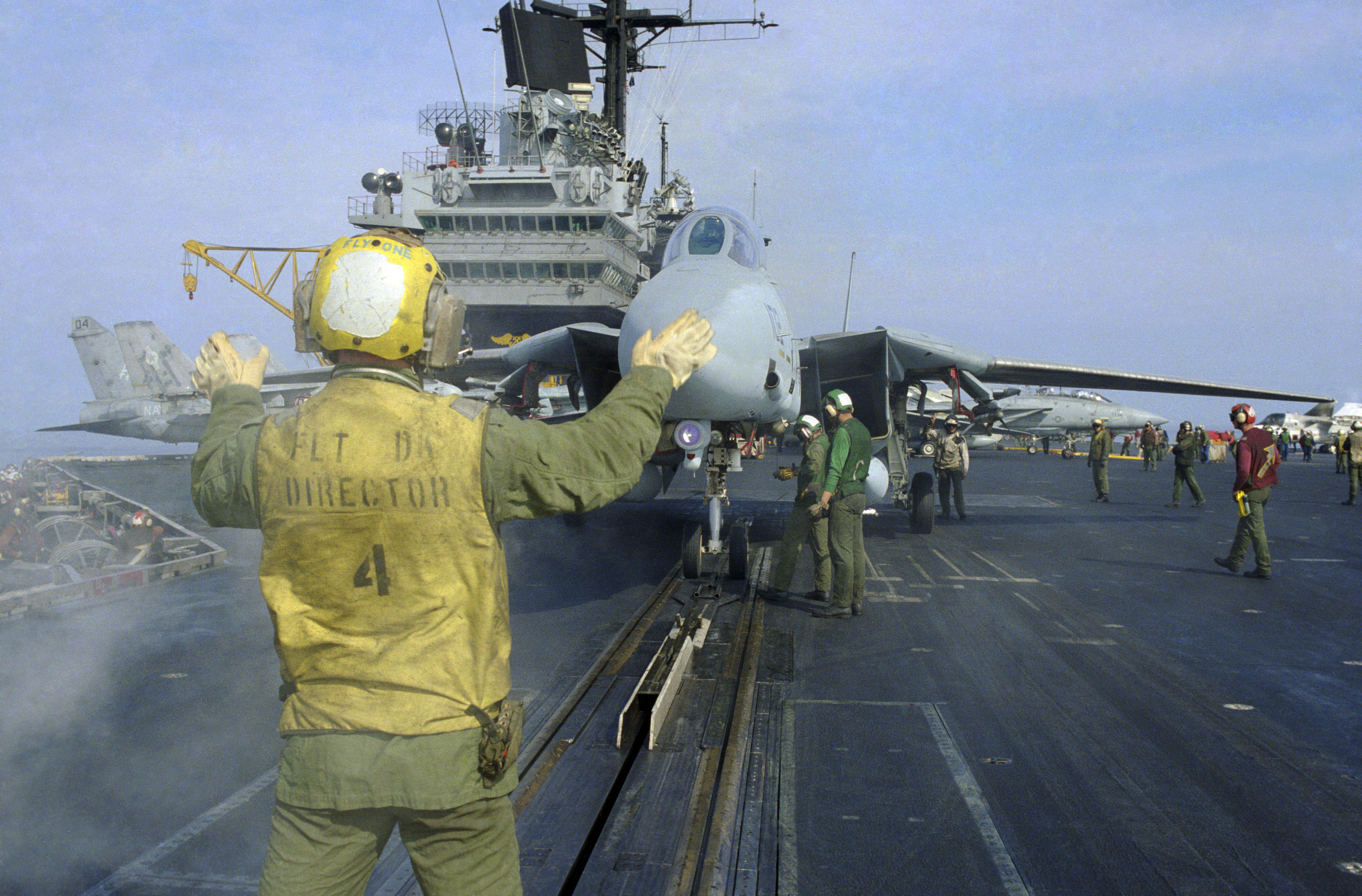
An F-14 Tomcat preparing for attachment to a steam catapult on USS Saratoga

A J-15T Flying Shark ready for an electromagnetic catapult launch from PLAN aircraft carrier Fujian

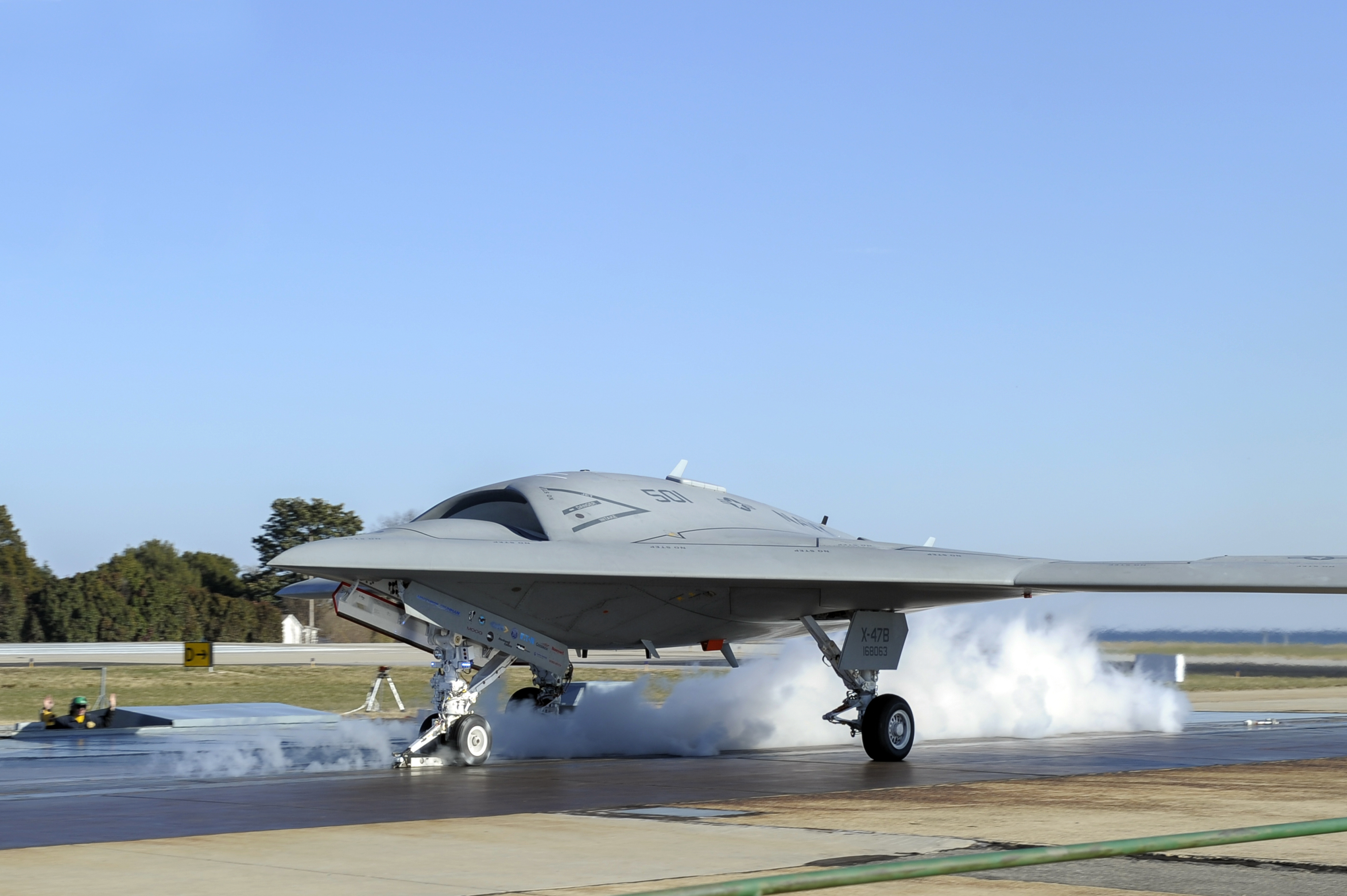
An X-47B demonstrator UCAV for a land-based catapult launch at NAS Pax River

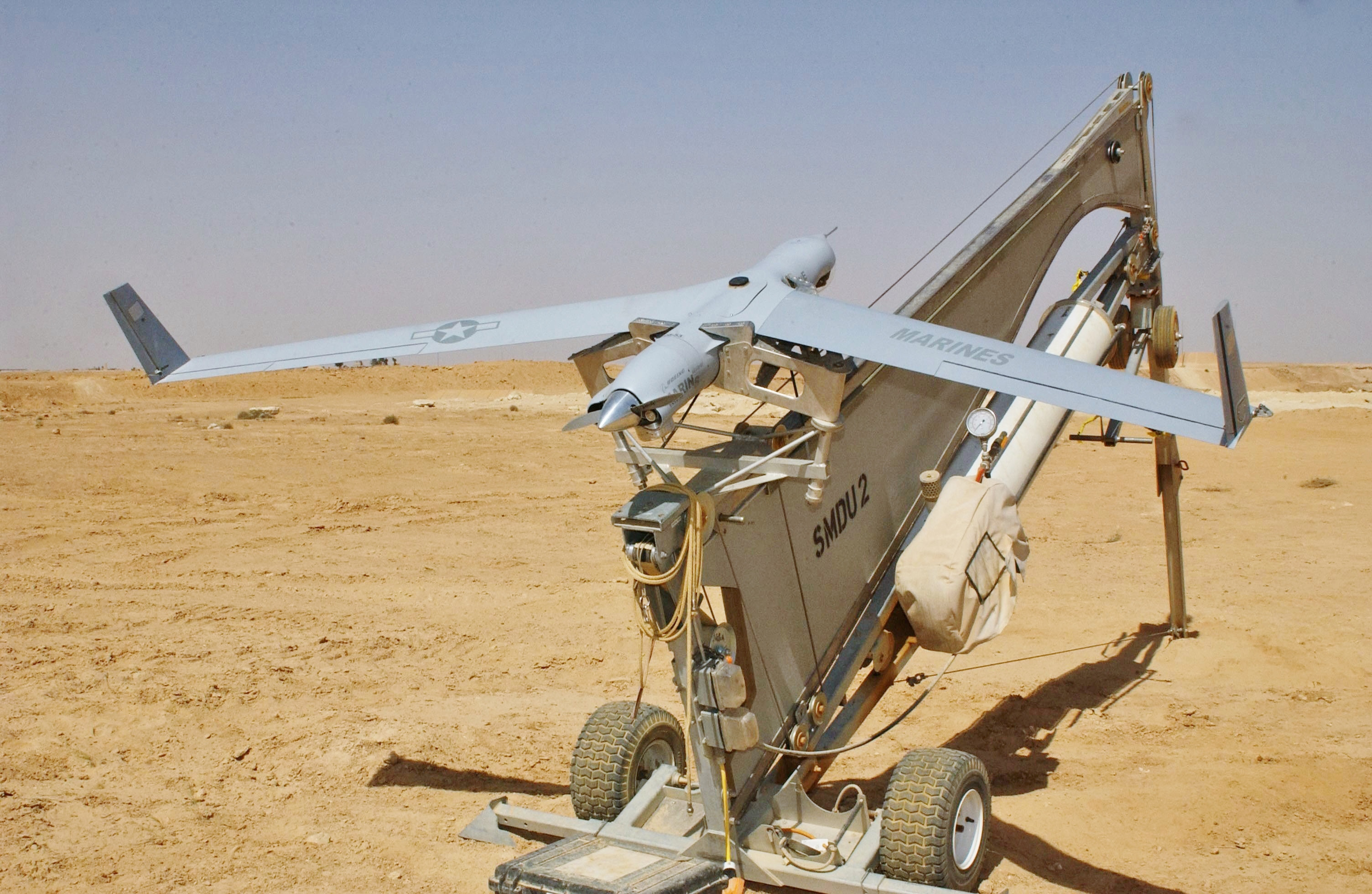
An MQ-27 ScanEagle UAV on a mobile catapult

An aircraft catapult is an acceleration device used to help fixed-wing aircraft reach liftoff speed (V_{LOF}) faster during takeoff, typically when trying to take off from a very short runway, as otherwise the aircraft engines alone cannot get the aircraft to sufficient airspeed quickly enough for the wings to generate the lift needed to sustain flight. Launching via catapults enables aircraft that typically are only capable of conventional takeoffs, especially heavier aircraft with significant payloads, to perform short takeoffs from the roll distances of light aircraft. Catapults are usually used on the deck of a ship – such as the flight deck of an aircraft carrier — as a form of assisted takeoff for navalised aircraft, but can also be installed on land-based runways, although this is rare.

Historically it was most common for seaplanes (which have pontoons instead of wheeled landing gears and thus cannot use runways) to be catapulted from ships onto nearby water for takeoff, allowing them to conduct aerial reconnaissance missions and be crane-hoisted back on board during retrieval, although by the late First World War their roles are largely supplanted by the more versatile biplanes that can take off and land on carrier decks unassisted. During the Second World War before the advent of escort carriers, monoplane fighter aircraft (notably the Hawker Hurricane) would sometimes be catapulted from "catapult-equipped merchant" (CAM) vessels for one-way sorties to repel enemy aircraft harassing shipping lanes, forcing the returning pilot to either divert to a land-based airstrip, jump out by parachute, or ditch in the water near the convoy and wait for rescue. By the time fleet carriers became the norm in WW2, catapult launches have become largely unnecessary and carrier-based fighter-bombers would routinely perform self-powered takeoffs and landings off and onto carrier decks, especially during the naval aviation-dominated Pacific War between the United States and the Empire of Japan. However, escalating arms races during the Cold War accelerated the adoption of the heavier jet aircraft for naval operations, thus motivating the development of new catapult systems, especially after the popularization of angled flight decks further limited the practical distance available as takeoff runways. Nowadays, jet aircraft can launch from aircraft carriers via either catapults or ski-jump deck, and perform optics-assisted landing onto the same ship with help from decelerative arresting gears.

The catapult system used on modern aircraft carriers consists of a straight track or slot built into the flight deck, on top of which is a sliding piece called a shuttle, which protrudes above the deck and is hooked onto the nose gear of the aircraft; or in some cases a wire rope called a catapult bridle is attached between the aircraft and the catapult shuttle. When launching, the shuttle is driven forward by force mechanisms within the track system, "hurling out" the aircraft and imparting an additional propulsion on top of the aircraft's own engine thrust to help it accelerate. Other forms of catapult have been used historically, such as mounting a launching cart holding a seaplane on a long girder-built structure mounted on the deck of a warship or merchant ship, but most catapult systems share a similar sliding track concept.

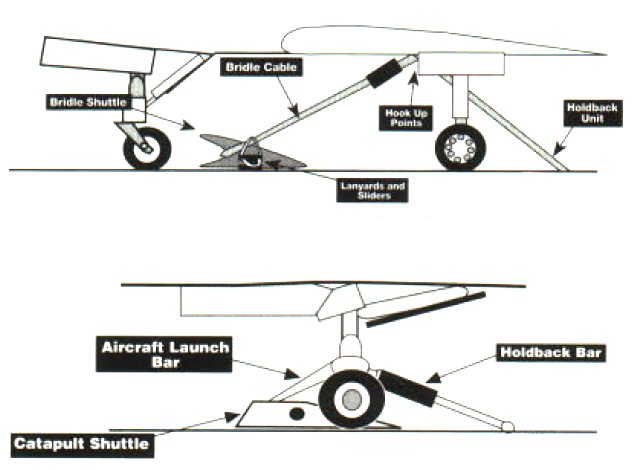
Catapult launching systems

Different means have been used to propel the catapult, such as weight and derrick, gunpowder, flywheel, compressed air, hydraulic, steam power, and solid fuel rocket boosters. Since the second half of the 20th century, steam catapults have been the mainstay form of aircraft carrier catapults, especially on the nuclear-powered Nimitz-class supercarriers, and is the core component of the catapult-assisted takeoff but arrested recovery (CATOBAR) system. Into the 21st century, General Atomics has developed an alternating current linear motor-based electromagnetic catapult system called the Electromagnetic Aircraft Launch System (EMALS), which is installed on the United States Navy's new Gerald R. Ford-class aircraft carriers. A direct current-based electromagnetic catapult has also been developed by the People's Republic of China for the People's Liberation Army Navy's Type 003 aircraft carrier Fujian, as well as the upcoming Type 076 amphibious assault ship Sichuan (currently fitting out) and Type 004 aircraft carriers (in-construction).

== History ==
=== First recorded flight using a catapult ===
Samuel Langley's catapult, houseboat and unsuccessful man-carrying Aerodrome (1903)

The aviation pioneer and Smithsonian Secretary Samuel Langley used a spring-operated catapult to launch his successful flying models and his failed Aerodrome of 1903. The Wright brothers had laid a rail to allow their Flyer to gain sufficient speed in their first successful attempt to launch it, done in 1903 in coastal North Carolina with the wind’s assistance, but wind speeds around their home in Ohio were seldom as high. After extending their launch rail to over 250 feet (76 m) along uneven ground and finding that shifting winds made the task impractical, they decided to build their next airplane a catapult in the form of a derrick-like metal tower. From the tower hung cast iron weights totaling 1,400 pounds (640 kg) suspended by a rope, attached to the plane and leveraged three to one so that their fall of over 16 feet (4.9 m) would pull the plane 50 feet (15 m) forward, where a loop on the rope would slip off, the plane by then moving fast enough to rise into the air. The brothers began using this catapult launcher in September 1904.

On 31 July 1912, Theodore Gordon Ellyson became the first person to be launched from a U.S. Navy catapult system. The Navy had been perfecting a compressed-air catapult system and mounted it on the Santee Dock in Annapolis, Maryland. The first attempt nearly killed Lieutenant Ellyson when the plane left the ramp with its nose pointing upward and it caught a crosswind, pushing the plane into the water. Ellyson was able to escape from the wreckage unhurt. On 12 November 1912, Lt. Ellyson made history as the Navy's first successful catapult launch, from a stationary coal barge. On 5 November 1915, Lieutenant Commander Henry C. Mustin made the first catapult launch from a ship underway.

=== Application timeline ===
Feature	First seen	First demonstrated on	First commissioned carrier	Entry into service	Notes
Naval catapult	1915	USS North Carolina	USS Langley – compressed air USS Lexington – fly wheel HMS Courageous – hydraulic	1922; 1927; 1934	Lt. Cmdr. Henry Mustin made the first successful launch on November 5, 1915,
Steam catapult	1950	HMS Perseus	USS Hancock	1954	added to Hancock during her 1953 SCB-27C refit.
Electromagnetic catapult	2010	Lakehurst Maxfield Field	USS Gerald R. Ford	2017	General Atomics EMALS

=== Interwar and World War II ===
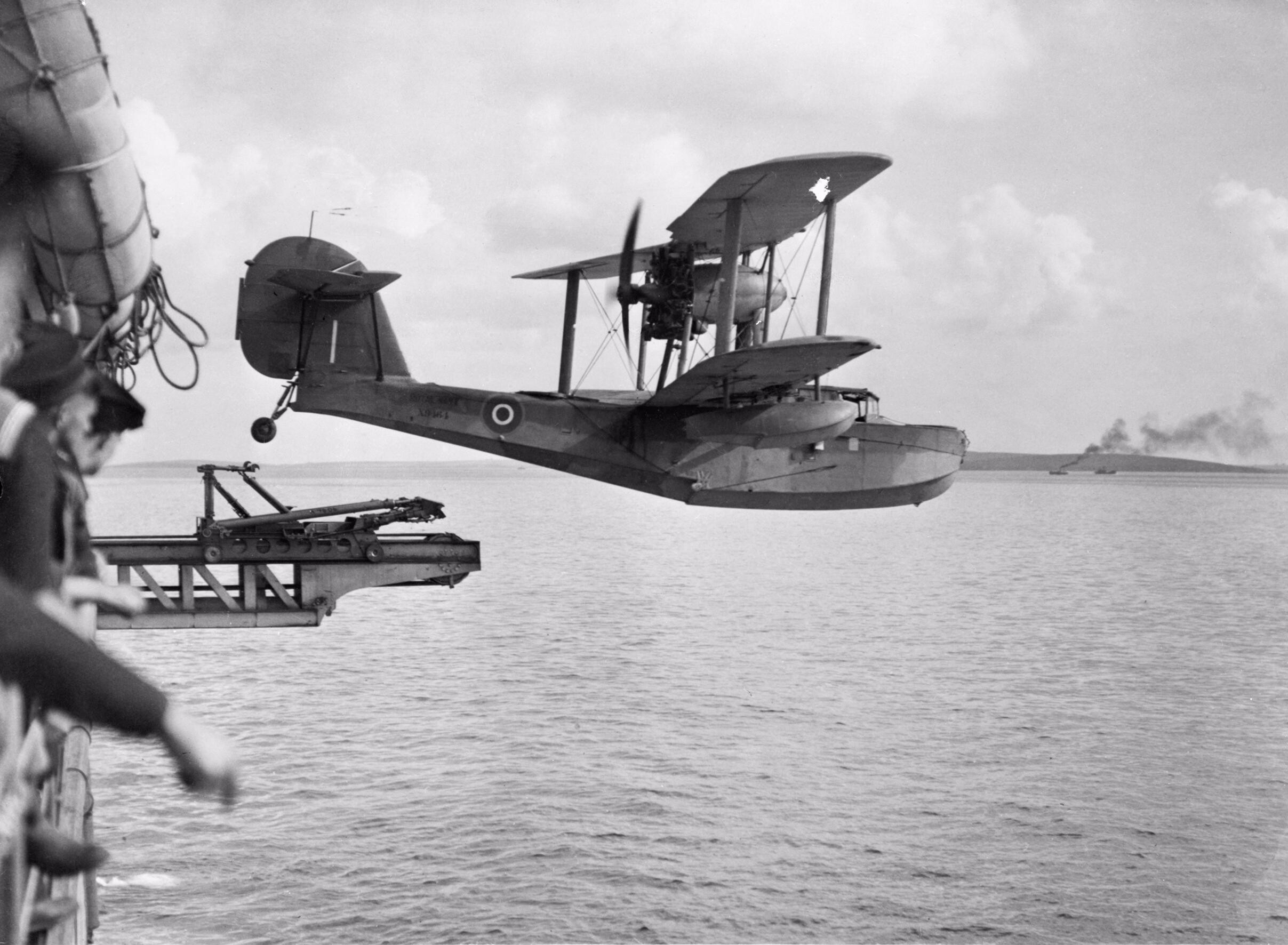
A Supermarine Walrus being launched from the catapult of HMS Bermuda (1943)

The US Navy experimented with other power sources and models, including catapults that used gunpowder and flywheel variations. On 14 December 1924, a Martin MO-1 observation plane flown by Lt. L. C. Hayden was launched from USS Langley using a catapult powered by gunpowder. Following this launch, this method was used aboard both cruisers and battleships.

By 1929, the German ocean liners SS Bremen and Europa had been fitted with compressed-air catapults designed by the Heinkel aviation firm of Rostock, with further work with catapult air mail across the South Atlantic Ocean, being undertaken during the first half of the 1930s, with Dornier Wal twin-engined flying boats.

Up to and during World War II, most catapults on aircraft carriers were hydraulic. United States Navy catapults on surface warships, however, were operated with explosive charges similar to those used for 130-millimeter (5-inch) guns. Some carriers were completed before and during World War II with catapults on the hangar deck that fired athwartships, but they were unpopular because of their short run, low clearance of the hangar decks, inability to add the ship's forward speed to the aircraft's airspeed for takeoff, and lower clearance from the water (conditions which afforded pilots far less margin for error in the first moments of flight). They were mostly used for experimental purposes, and their use was entirely discontinued during the latter half of the war.

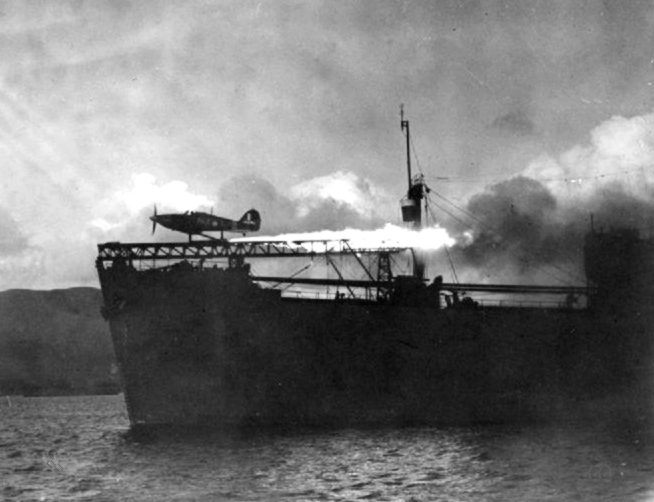
Test launch of a Hurricane using the rocket-catapult of a CAM ship, Greenock, Scotland, 31 May 1941

Many naval vessels apart from aircraft carriers carried float planes, seaplanes or amphibians for reconnaissance and spotting. They were catapult-launched and landed on the sea alongside for recovery by crane. Additionally, the concept of submarine aircraft carriers was developed by multiple nations during the interwar period, and through until WW2 and beyond, wherein a submarine would launch a small number of floatplanes for offensive operations or artillery spotting, to be recovered by the submarine once the aircraft has landed. The first launch off a Royal Navy battlecruiser was from HMAS Australia on 8 March 1918. Subsequently, many Royal Navy ships carried a catapult and from one to four aircraft; battleships or battlecruisers like HMS Prince of Wales carried four aircraft and HMS Rodney carried two, while smaller warships like the cruiser HMNZS Leander carried one. The aircraft carried were the Fairey Seafox or Supermarine Walrus. Some like HMS Nelson did not use a catapult, and the aircraft was lowered onto the sea for takeoff. Some had their aircraft and catapult removed during World War II e.g. HMS Duke of York, or before (HMS Ramillies).

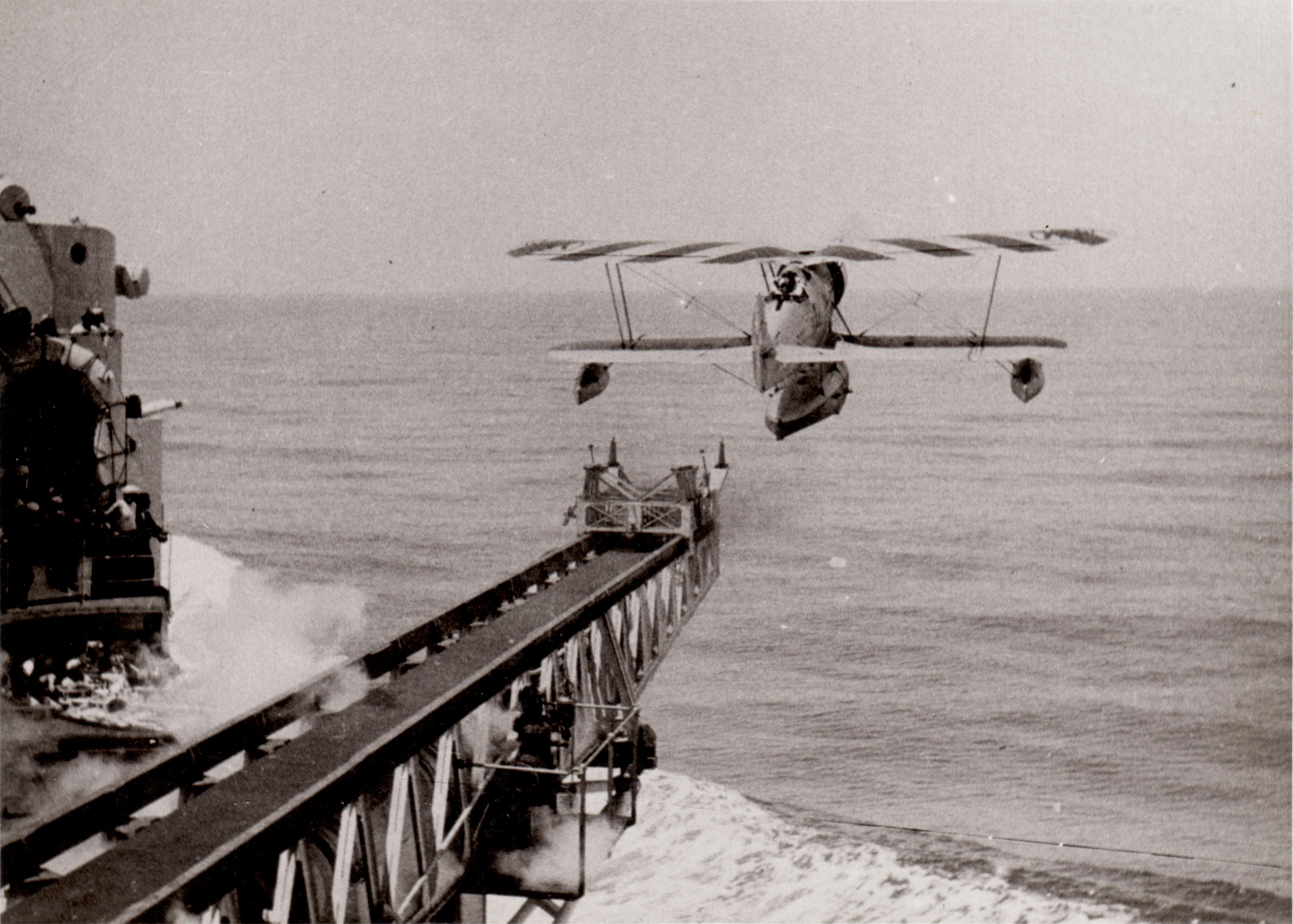
An IMAM Ro.43 floatplane catapulted by a RM cruiser in the early 1940s

During World War II a number of ships were fitted with rocket-driven catapults, first the fighter catapult ships of the Royal Navy, then armed merchantmen known as CAM ships from "catapult armed merchantmen". These were used for convoy escort duties to drive off enemy reconnaissance bombers. CAM ships carried a Hawker Sea Hurricane 1A, (Note: The Mk 1A Sea Hurricane was a simple conversion of battle-weary Hurricanes, in the expectation that they would be lost after one flight. There was no strengthening of the undercarriage for landing, merely the attachment points for the catapult launch.) dubbed a "Hurricat" or "Catafighter", and the pilot bailed out unless he could fly to land.

While imprisoned in Colditz Castle during the war, British prisoners of war planned an escape attempt using a falling bathtub full of heavy rocks and stones as the motive power for a catapult to be used for launching the Colditz Cock glider from the roof of the castle.

Ground-launched V-1s were typically propelled up an inclined launch ramp by an apparatus known as a Dampferzeuger ("steam generator").

=== Combustion catapult ===
An alternative approach to solving the problem posed by steam catapults was to integrate a small rocket motor into the catapult shuttle. A version of this system known as the C-14 Internal Combustion Catapult Powerplant, powered by jet fuel and compressed air, was developed by Reaction Motors starting in 1954. A full-scale mockup of the system was installed at Naval Air Station Lakehurst, and proved capable of generating 70,000,000 ft⋅lbf (95,000,000 J) of energy compared to 66,000,000 ft⋅lbf (89,000,000 J) of the existing C-13, but the system was never fielded. Originally intended for use on USS Enterprise (CVN-65), the ship was redesigned to use conventional C-13 catapults at the behest of Admiral Rickover shortly after launch in 1961 to reduce engineering risk and total cost.

=== Steam catapult ===
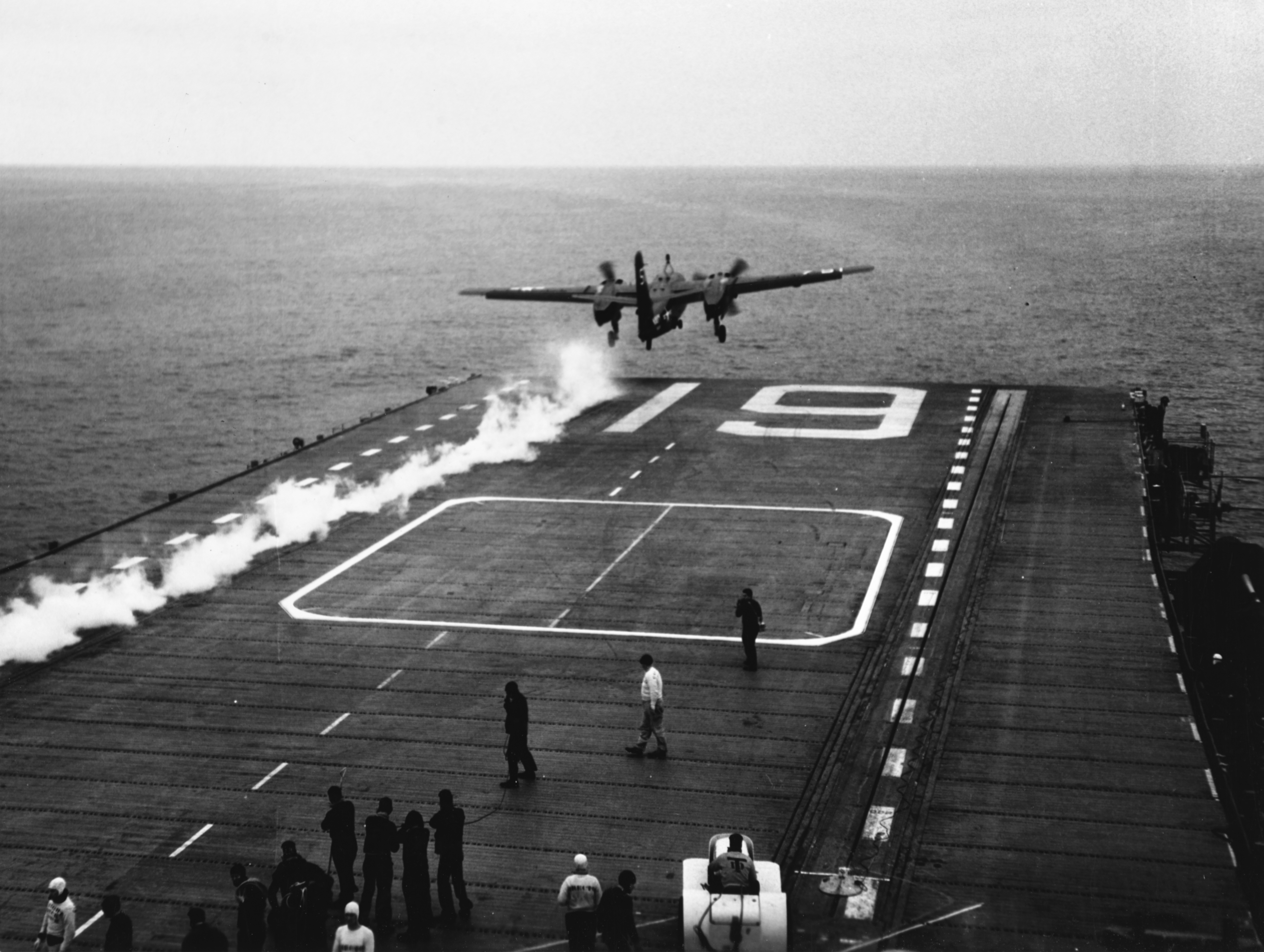
An S2F-1 Tracker, piloted by Cmdr. Henry J. Jackson, catapulting off USS Hancock on June 1, 1954, the first time an aircraft was launched by a steam catapult from a USN carrier

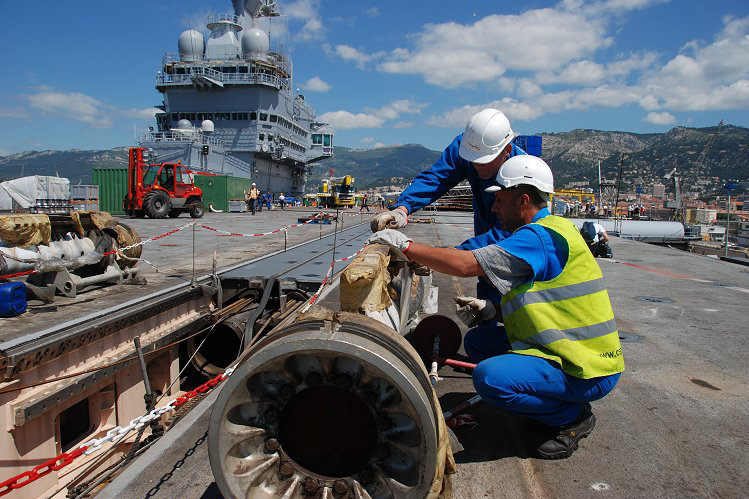
Elements of the catapult of Charles de Gaulle, disassembled during her refit in 2008

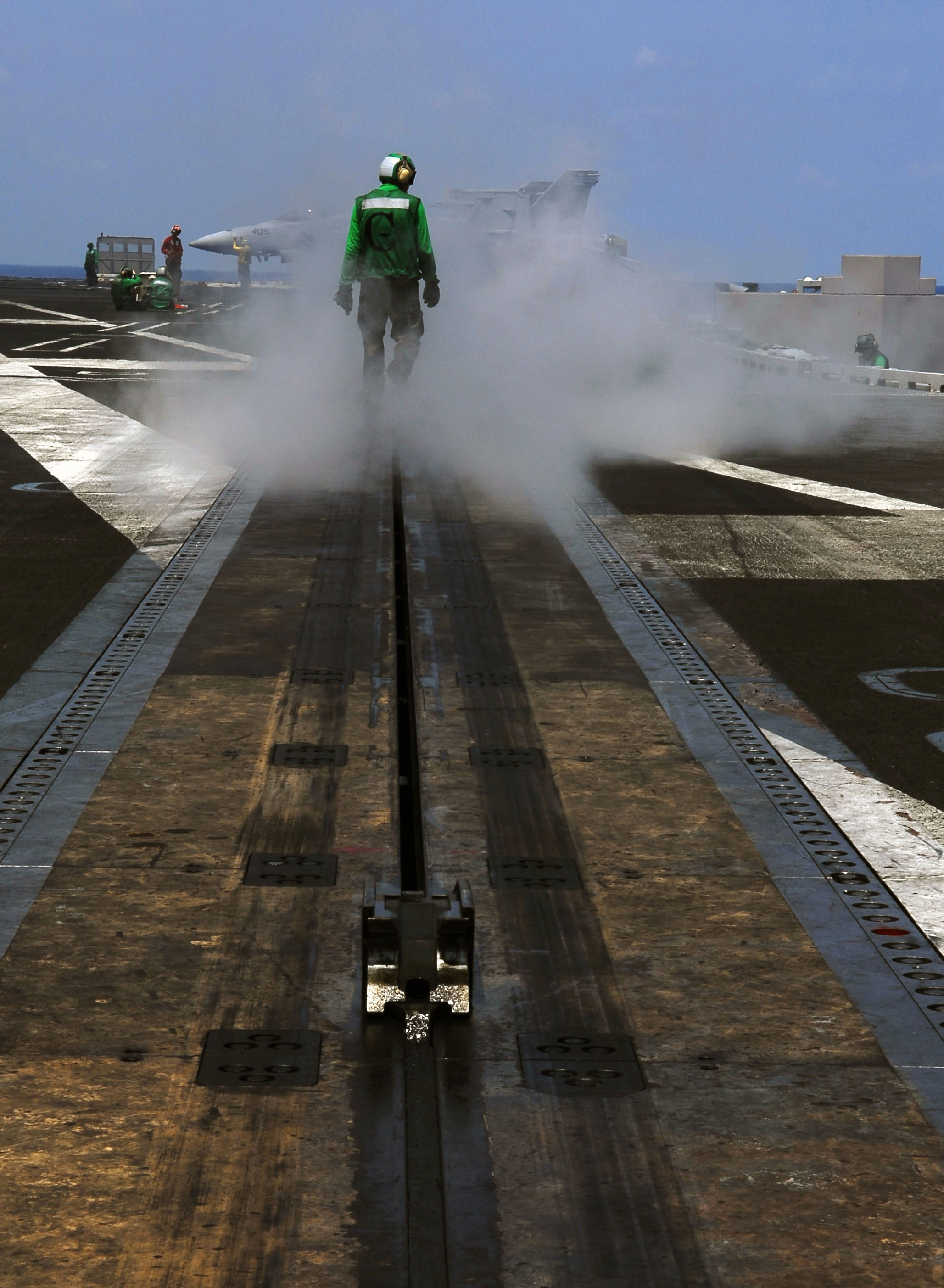
Final checks on an aircraft catapult prior to flight operations aboard USS John C. Stennis

Following World War II, the Royal Navy was developing a new catapult system for their fleet of carriers. Commander C. C. Mitchell, RNVR, recommended a superheated steam-based system using a slotted cylinder as an effective and efficient means to launch the next generation of naval aircraft. One motive was that the British ships were smaller than their American counterparts and so they had shorter catapult runs, making hydraulic catapults ineffective for launching the new heavier jet fighters. Trials on HMS Perseus, flown by pilots such as Eric "Winkle" Brown, from 1950 showed its effectiveness. NATO navies introduced steam catapults based on the British design in the mid-1950s; the U.S. Navy was also motivated by the need to launch heavy nuclear-armed jet bombers such as the Douglas A-3 Skywarrior and to avoid accidental fatalities caused by flammable hydraulic fluid. Gunpowder-driven catapults were also contemplated, and would have been powerful enough, but would also have introduced far greater stresses on the airframes and might have been unsuitable for long-term use.

At launch, a release bar holds the aircraft in place as steam pressure builds up, then breaks (or "releases"; older models used a pin that sheared), freeing the piston to pull the aircraft along the deck at high speed. Within about two to four seconds, aircraft velocity by the action of the catapult plus apparent wind speed (ship's speed plus or minus "natural" wind) is sufficient to allow an aircraft to fly away, even after losing one engine.

Most nations that have retained large aircraft carriers, i.e., the United States Navy and the French Navy, are still using a CATOBAR (Catapult Assisted Take Off But Arrested Recovery) configuration. U.S. Navy tactical aircraft use catapults to launch with a heavier warload than would otherwise be possible. Larger planes, such as the E-2 Hawkeye and S-3 Viking, require a catapult shot, since their thrust-to-weight ratio is too low for a conventional rolling takeoff on a carrier deck.

==== Steam catapult types ====
Types previously or still operated by the British, U.S. and French navies include:

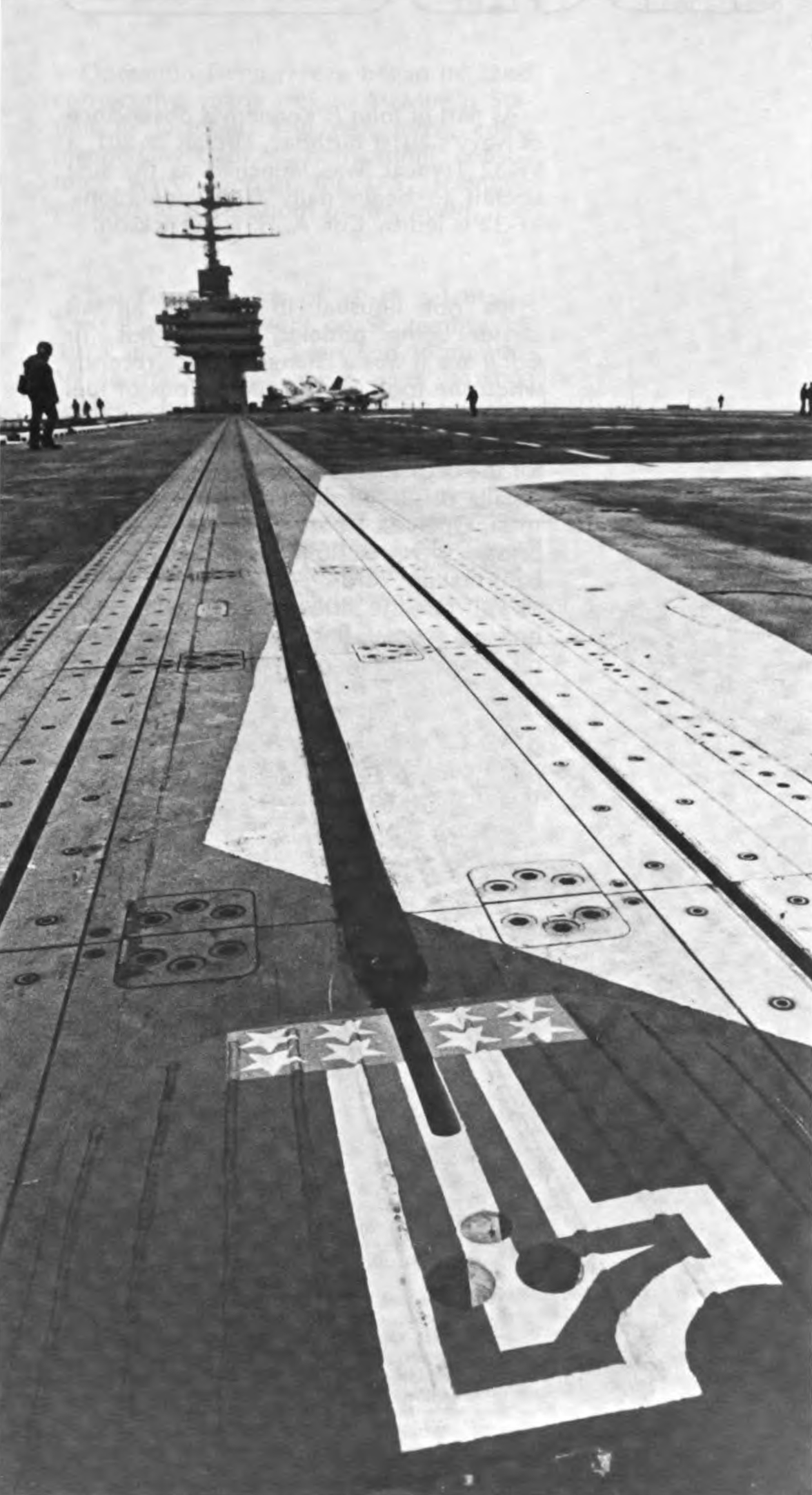
C-13-1 steam catapult on the USS Nimitz

Type	Overall length ft (m)	Stroke ft (m)	Capacity lb (tonnes)	Carriers
BXS 1		203 (62)	30,000 (14) at 123 knots	HMS Perseus (1 catapult)
BS 4		151 (46)		HMS Ark Royal (2 catapults)
C-11 and C-11-1	225 (69)	211 (64)	39,000 (18) at 136 knots; 70,000 (32) at 108 knots	SCB-27C Essex-class conversions, USS Coral Sea, bow installations on USS Midway and USS Franklin D. Roosevelt, waist installations on USS Forrestal and USS Saratoga
C-11-2	162 (49)	150 (46)		Waist catapults on USS Midway and USS Franklin D. Roosevelt
C-7	276 (84)	253 (77)	40,000 (18) at 148.5 knots; 70,000 (32) at 116 knots	USS Ranger, USS Independence, bow installations on USS Forrestal and USS Saratoga
C-13	265 (81)	250 (76)	78,000 (35) at 139 knots	Kitty Hawk class, USS Midway after SCB-101.66 modernization, USS Enterprise
C-13-1	325 (99)	310 (94)	80,000 (36) at 140 knots	One installation on USS America and USS John F. Kennedy, all on USS Nimitz, USS Dwight D. Eisenhower, USS Carl Vinson, and USS Theodore Roosevelt
C-13-2	325 (99)	306 (93)		USS Abraham Lincoln, USS George Washington, USS John C. Stennis, USS Harry S. Truman
C-13-3	261 (80)	246 (75)	60,000 (27) at 140 knots	French aircraft carrier Charles de Gaulle

==== Bridle catchers ====
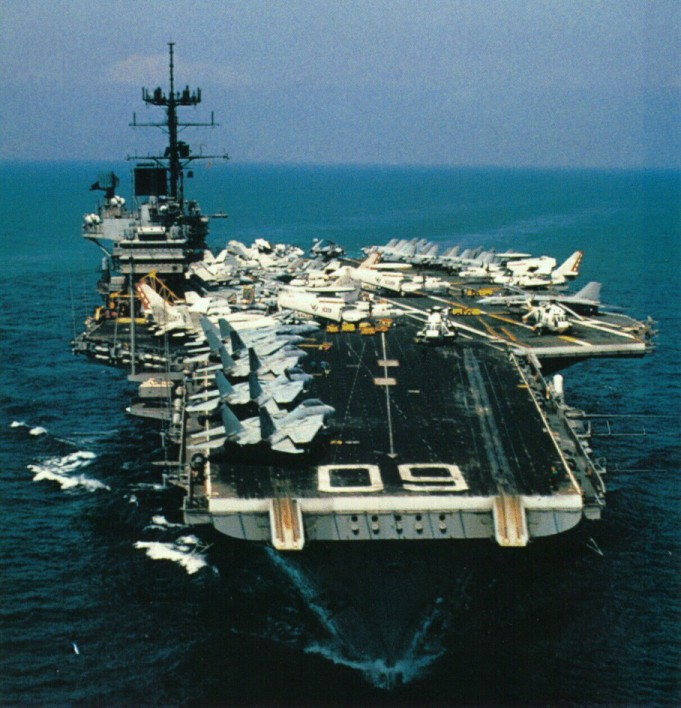
USS Saratoga underway. The bridle catchers are the extensions at the end of the forward catapults

The protruding angled ramps (Van Velm Bridle Arresters or horns) at the catapult ends on some aircraft carriers were used to catch the bridles (connectors between the catapult shuttle and aircraft fuselage) for reuse. There were small ropes that would attach the bridle to the shuttle, which continued down the angled horn to pull the bridle down and away from the aircraft to keep it from damaging the underbelly. The bridle would then be caught by nets aside the horn. Bridles have not been used on U.S. aircraft since the end of the Cold War, and all U.S. Navy carriers commissioned since then have not had the ramps. The last U.S. carrier commissioned with a bridle catcher was USS Carl Vinson; starting with USS Theodore Roosevelt the ramps were omitted. During Refueling and Complex Overhaul refits in the late 1990s–early 2000s, the bridle catchers were removed from the first three Nimitz-class aircraft carriers. USS Enterprise was the last U.S. Navy operational carrier with the ramps still attached before her inactivation in 2012.

Like her American counterparts, the French aircraft carrier Charles De Gaulle is not equipped with bridle catchers because the modern aircraft operated on board use the same launch systems as in US Navy. Because of this mutual interoperability, American aircraft are also capable of being catapulted from and landing on Charles De Gaulle, and conversely, French naval aircraft can use the US Navy carriers' catapults. At the time when the Super Étendard was operated on board of the Charles de Gaulle, its bridles were used only once, as they were never recovered by bridle catchers.

The carriers Clemenceau and Foch were also equipped with bridle catchers, not for the Super Étendards but only to catch and recover the Vought F-8 Crusader's bridles.

=== Electromagnetic catapult ===
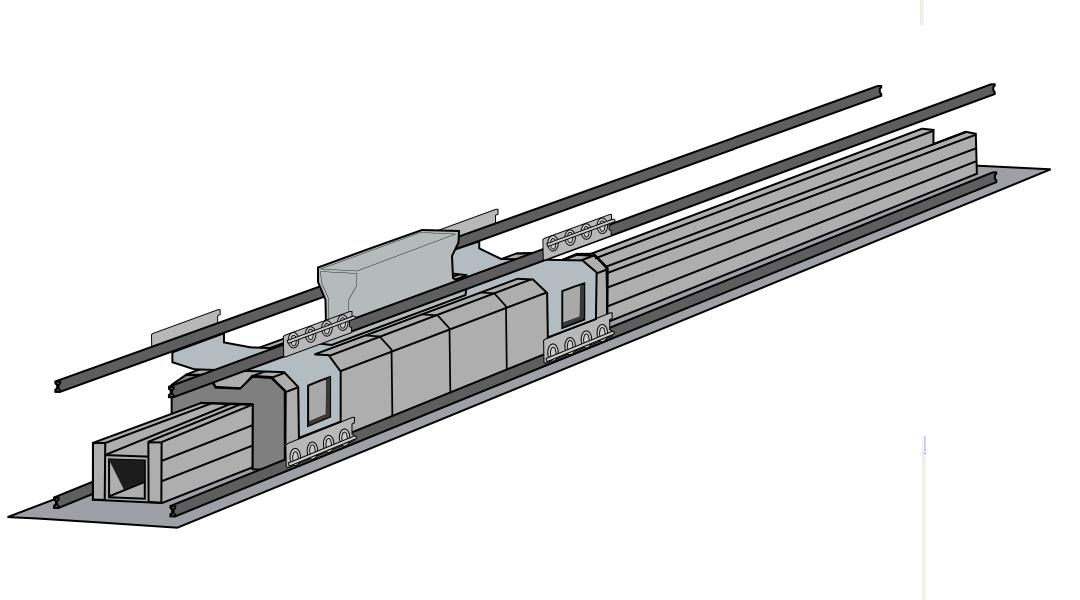
A computer-generated model of the linear induction motor used in the EMALS.

The size and manpower requirements of steam catapults place limits on their capabilities. A newer approach is the electromagnetic catapult, such as Electromagnetic Aircraft Launch System (EMALS) developed by General Atomics. Electromagnetic catapults place less stress on the aircraft and offer more control during the launch by allowing gradual and continual acceleration. Electromagnetic catapults are also expected to require significantly less maintenance through the use of solid state components.

Linear induction motors have been experimented with before, such as Westinghouse's Electropult system in 1945. However, at the beginning of the 21st century, navies again started experimenting with catapults powered by linear induction motors and electromagnets. Electromagnetic catapult would be more energy efficient on nuclear-powered aircraft carriers and would alleviate some of the dangers posed by using pressurized steam. On gas-turbine powered ships, an electromagnetic catapult would eliminate the need for a separate steam boiler for generating catapult steam. The U.S. Navy's Gerald R. Ford-class aircraft carriers and PLA Navy's Type 003 aircraft carrier included electromagnetic catapults in their design.

== Civilian use ==
From 1929, the German Norddeutscher Lloyd-liners SS Bremen and Europa were fitted with compressed air-driven catapults designed by the Heinkel Flugzeugwerke to launch mail-planes. These ships served the route between Germany and the United States. The aircraft, carrying mail–bags, would be launched as a mail tender while the ship was still many hundreds of miles from its destination, thus speeding mail delivery by about a day. Initially, Heinkel He 12 aircraft were used before they were replaced by Junkers Ju 46, which were in turn replaced by the Vought V-85G.

German airline Lufthansa subsequently used dedicated catapult ships SS Westfalen, MS Schwabenland, Ostmark and Friesenland to launch larger Dornier Do J Wal (whale), Dornier Do 18 and Dornier Do 26 flying boats on the South Atlantic airmail service from Stuttgart, Germany to Natal, Brazil. On route proving flights in 1933, and a scheduled service beginning in February 1934, Wals flew the trans-ocean stage of the route, between Bathurst, the Gambia in West Africa and Fernando de Noronha, an island group off South America. At first, there was a refueling stop in mid-ocean. The flying boat would land on the open sea, be winched aboard by a crane, refueled, and then launched by catapult back into the air. However, landing on the big ocean swells tended to damage the hull of the flying boats. From September 1934, Lufthansa had a support ship at each end of the trans-ocean stage, providing radio navigation signals and catapult launchings after carrying aircraft out to sea overnight. From April 1935 the Wals were launched directly offshore, and flew the entire distance across the ocean. This was possible as the flying boats could carry more fuel when they did not have to take off from the water under their own power, and cut the time it took for mail to get from Germany to Brazil from four days down to three.

From 1936 to 1938, tests including the Blohm & Voss Ha 139 flying boat were conducted on the North Atlantic route to New York. Schwabenland was also used in an Antarctic expedition in 1938/39 with the main purpose of finding an area for a German whaling station, in which catapult-launched Wals surveyed a territory subsequently name after the ship, "Neu-Schwabenland". All of Lufthansa's catapult ships were taken over by the Luftwaffe in 1939 and used as seaplane tenders in World War II along with three catapult ships built for the military.

After World War II, Supermarine Walrus amphibian aircraft were also briefly operated by a British whaling company, United Whalers. Operating in the Antarctic, they were launched from the factory ship FF Balaena, which had been equipped with an ex-navy aircraft catapult.

== Alternatives to catapults ==
The Chinese, Russian, Indian and currently the Royal Navy have operated conventional aircraft from aircraft carriers without catapults, via the "short take-off but arrested recovery" (STOBAR) system. STOBAR carriers use an upward-curved ramp called a ski-jump to assist aircraft takeoff with a positive initial rate of climb, which gives the aircraft's engines more time to accelerate it to the minimum airspeed needed. Carrier-based aircraft such as the J-15, Mig-29K and Su-33 can take off conventionally from a ski-jump relying only on their own engines for accelerative propulsion, but they typically can only do so with a reduced weight, meaning that they have to make sacrifices on payload such as fuel and armaments. As a result, STOBAR systems are less optimal than CATOBAR systems, but they allow navies who do not have the capabiliity to acquire catapult carriers to still launch fixed-wing aircraft at sea.

Other navies with aircraft carriers typically operate short take-off and vertical landing (STOVL) aircraft, such as the B variant of the Lockheed Martin F-35 Lightning II, the BAE Sea Harrier and the AV-8B Harrier II. These aircraft have thrust vectoring and can take off vertically with a light load, or use a ski-jump to assist a conventional takeoff with a heavy load. STOVL carriers are less expensive and generally a lot smaller in size than CATOBAR or STOBAR carriers. The British Queen Elizabeth-class aircraft carriers were built to use STOVL aircraft due to the expected high cost of an electromagnetic catapult; because their propulsion is electrically powered from diesel and gas turbine generators they do not have the means to generate steam for a conventional catapult.

== See also ==
- Ground carriage
- Jet blast deflector
- List of auxiliaries of the United States Navy § Seaplane catapult, light (AVC)
- List of yard and district craft of the United States Navy § Catapult barges (YVC)
- Modern US Navy carrier operations
- Naval aviation
- Arresting gear – Cable used to rapidly decelerate an aircraft as it lands

== Citations ==
=== Sources ===
- Chant, Stephen J.; Campbell, Douglas E. (2013). Patent Log: Innovative Patents that Advanced the United States Navy. Syneca Research Group, Inc. ISBN 978-1-105-62562-6.
- Cook, John (March 2002). "Shot from Ships: Air Mail Service on Bremen and Europa". Air Classics. Archived from the original on February 1, 2014.
- Denison, K. B. (April 1957). "A steam catapult installation". Journal of Naval Engineering. 10 (2) – via Naval Marine Archive – The Canadian Collection.
- Edwards, Christopher (January 2011). "Fire Down Below!". Naval History. 25 (1). U.S. Naval Institute.
- Friedman, Norman (1983). U.S. Aircraft Carriers: An Illustrated Design History. U.S. Naval Institute. ISBN 978-0-87021-739-5.
- Friedman, Norman (December 2016). "Armaments & Innovations - The Steam-Powered 'Cat'". Naval History. 30 (6). U.S. Naval Institute.
- Gady, Franz-Stefan (6 November 2017). "China's New Aircraft Carrier to Use Advanced Jet Launch System". The Diplomat.
- Laithwaite, Eric R. (February 1975). "Linear Electric Machines- A Personal View". Proceedings of the IEEE. 63 (2).
- Leonhardt, Rene (1 February 1933). "First Transatlantic Airline Links Two Continents". Popular Science. 122 (2). Bonnier Corporation – via Google Books.
- London, Peter (2003). British Flying Boats. Stoud, UK: Sutton Publishers Ltd. ISBN 0-7509-2695-3.
- McFarland, Stephen L. (1997). A Concise History of the U.S. Air Force. Ft. Belvoir: Defense Technical Information Center. ISBN 0-16-049208-4.
- McKay, Dave (2013). USS Enterprise CVA(N)-65 to CVN-65: The World's First Nuclear-Powered Aircraft Carrier [25]. Christchurch, New Zealand: Wilsonscott Publishing. ISBN 9781877427503.
- Power, Hugh Irvin (1996). Carrier Lexington. College Station, TX: Texas A&M University Press. ISBN 978-0-89096-681-5.
- Skerrett, Robert G. (April 2, 1916). "Our Navy Has the Best Seaplane Catapult; New Invention of Captain Washington I. Chambers Makes It Possible to Launch Aircraft from a Warship's Deck at Sea" (PDF). query.nytimes.com. New York Times.
- Werrell, Kenneth P. (1985), The Evolution of the Cruise Missile, Maxwell Air Force Base, Alabama: Air University Press
