= C. C. Mitchell =

Scottish mechanical engineer

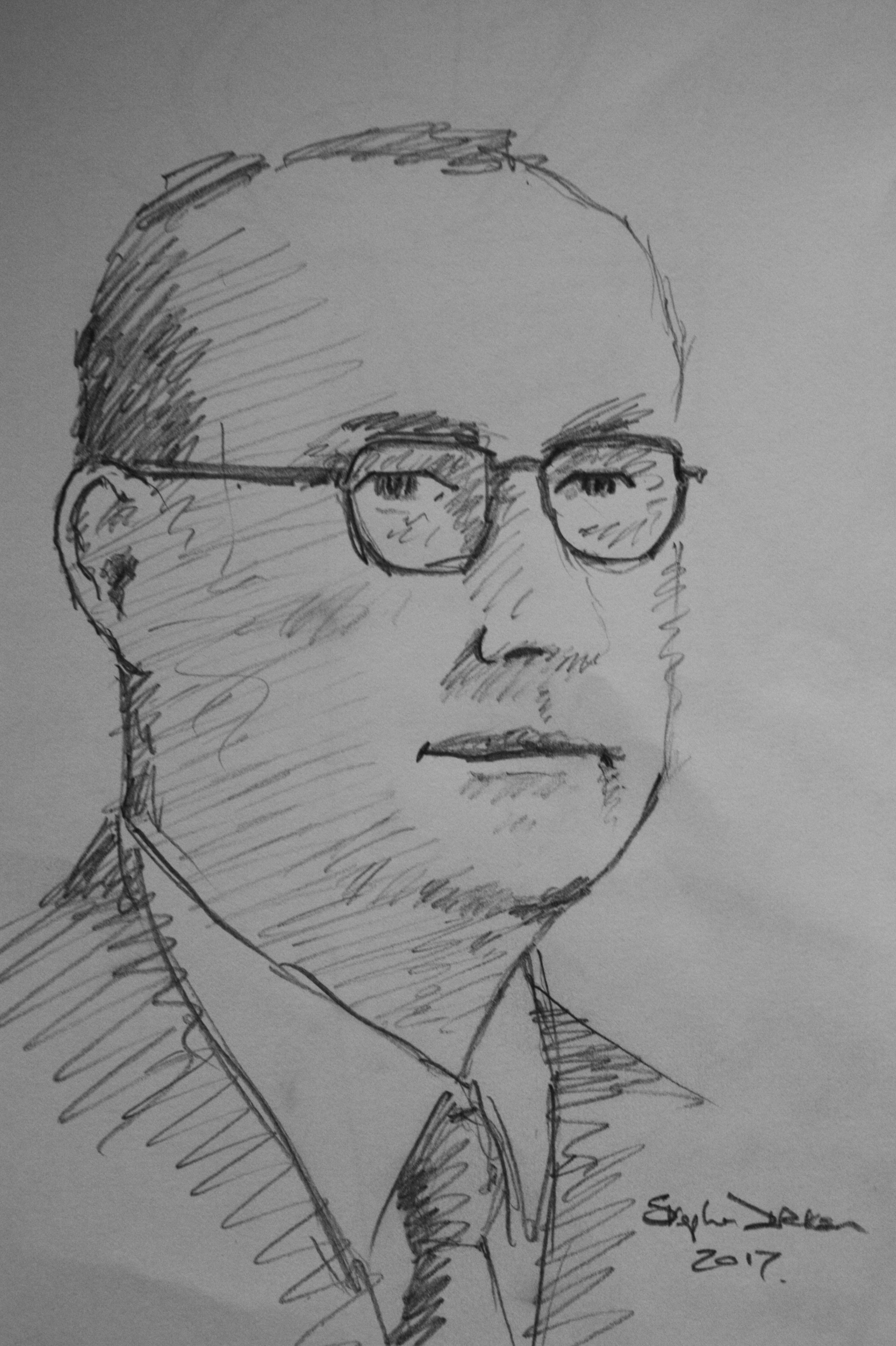
Colin Campbell Mitchell

Commander Colin Campbell Mitchell FRSE MIME OBE (1904–21 January 1969) was a Scottish mechanical engineer also with a very prominent service record in the Royal Navy. He was the inventor of the Aircraft catapult and Aircraft arresting gear used on aircraft carriers. He was usually referred to as Commander C. C. Mitchell.

== Life ==
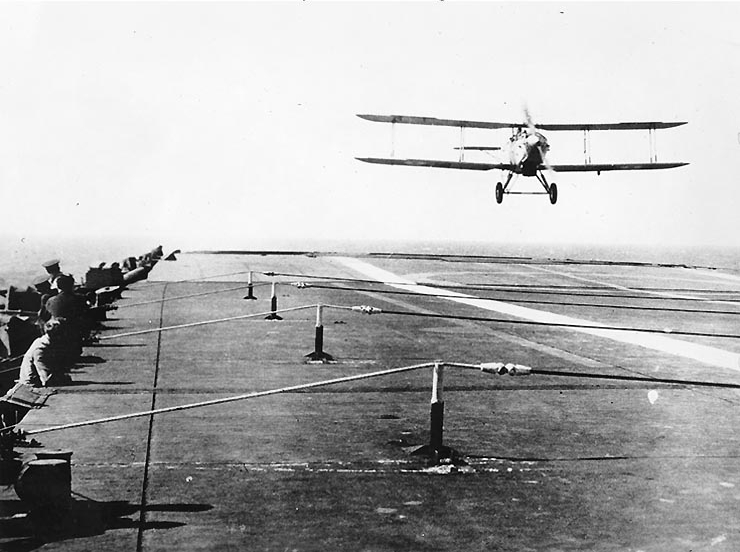
Arresting gear wires on HMS Furious in the early 1930s

He was born in Edinburgh the son of Mary Agnes Mitchell and her husband, the artist John Campbell Mitchell RSA (1862–1922). He was educated at Edinburgh Academy then studied engineering at the University of Edinburgh graduating with a BSc in 1925.

He joined the staff of MacTaggart Scott & Co in Loanhead on graduating and was promoted to Technical Director in 1931. His invention of aircraft arresting gear in 1931 brought him to the attention of the Admiralty. In the Second World War he served in the Royal Navy and reached the rank of Commander. He served as Engineer-in-Chief to the Admiralty. He was one of the investigating officers into the V1 launch sites. After the War he became Director of Brown Brothers & Co on Broughton Road in Edinburgh.

In 1955 he was the first non-American to win the Newcomen Gold Medal. In 1958 President Dwight Eisenhower awarded him the Medal of Freedom of the United States.

In 1962 he was elected a Fellow of the Royal Society of Edinburgh. His proposers were Sir William Wallace, Ronald Arnold, Charles Patterson and Robert Schlapp.

He died in Edinburgh on 21 January 1969.

== Family ==
His elder brother, Lt John Patrick Campbell Mitchell, was killed whilst serving in the Royal Flying Corps in the First World War on 21 April 1917 during the Second Battle of Arras. He was only 19. He is buried in Bruay Communal Cemetery Extension.
