= Deck (ship) =

Part of a ship or boat

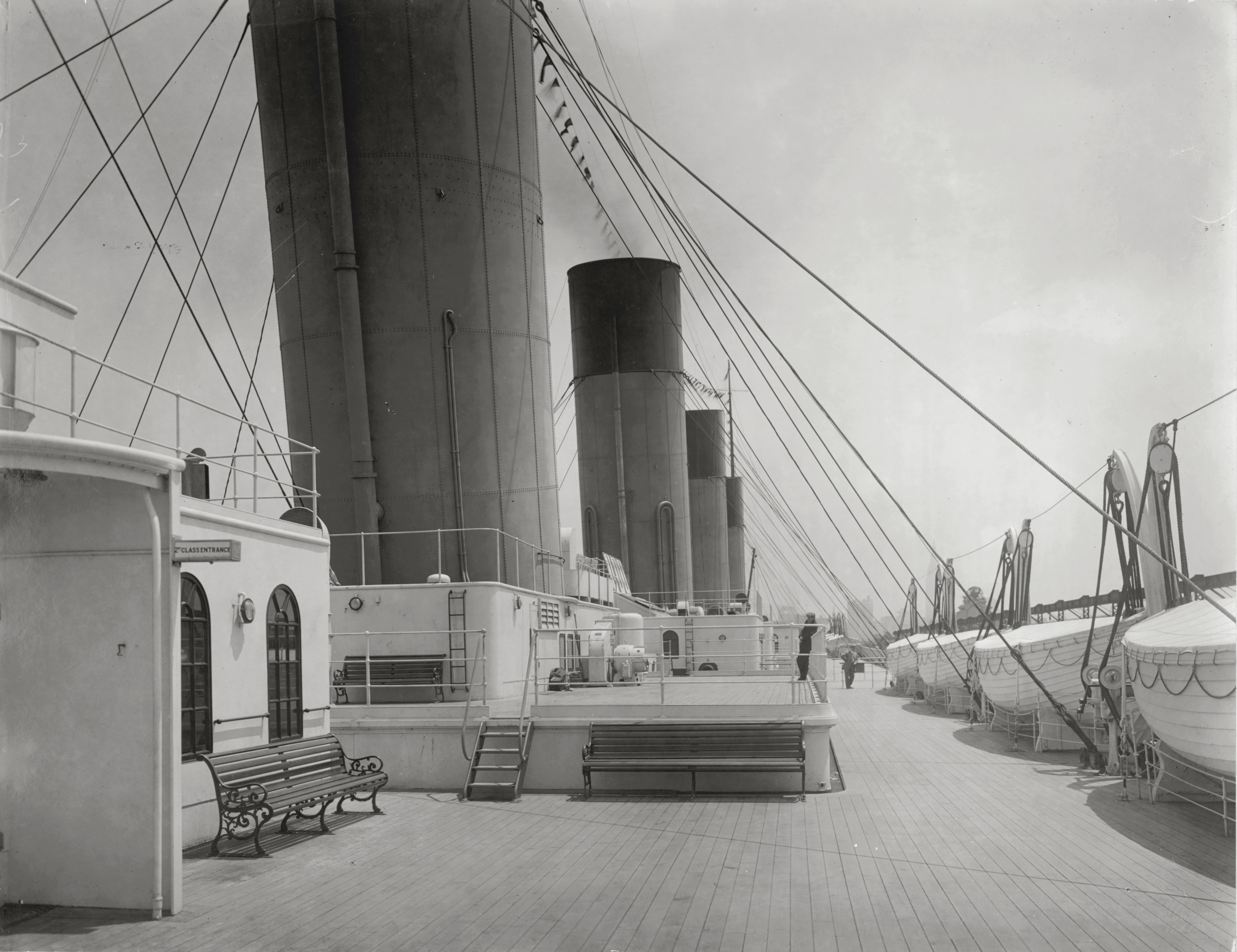
RMS Olympic's deck

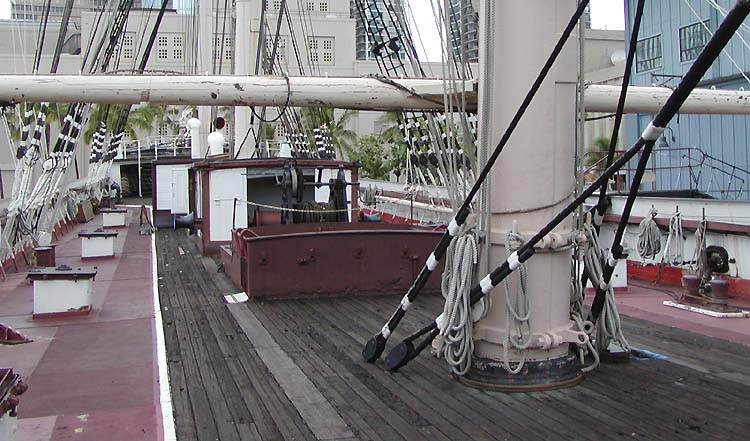
The upper deck of the Falls of Clyde is iron; a centre strip is planked with wood as a sort of walkway. As is typical for a late-19th-century vessel, several deckhouses may be seen.

A deck is a permanent covering over a compartment or a hull of a ship. On a boat or ship, the primary or upper deck is the horizontal structure that forms the "roof" of the hull, strengthening it and serving as the primary working surface. Vessels often have more than one level both within the hull and in the superstructure above the primary deck, similar to the floors of a multi-storey building, that are also referred to as decks, as are certain compartments and decks built over specific areas of the superstructure. Decks for some purposes have specific names.

== Structure ==
The main purpose of the upper or primary deck is structural, and only secondarily to provide weather-tightness and support people and equipment. The deck serves as the lid to the complex box girder which can be identified as the hull. It resists tension, compression, and racking forces. The deck's scantling is usually the same as the topsides, or might be heavier if the deck is expected to carry heavier loads (for example a container ship). The deck will be reinforced around deck fittings such as the capstan, cleats, or bollards.

Crew and passengers on the wraparound deck of RMS Queen Mary 2, an ocean liner

On ships with more than one level, 'deck' refers to the level itself. The actual floor surface is called the sole; the term 'deck' refers to a structural member tying the ship's frames or ribs together over the keel. In modern ships, the interior decks are usually numbered from the primary deck, which is #1, downward and upward. So the first deck below the primary deck will be #2, and the first above the primary deck will be #A2 or #S2 (for "above" or "superstructure"). Some merchant ships may alternatively designate decks below the primary deck, usually machinery spaces, by numbers, and those above it, in the accommodation block, by letters. Ships may also call decks by common names, or (especially on cruise ships) may invent fanciful and romantic names for a specific deck or area of that specific ship, such as the lido deck of the Princess Cruises' Love Boat.

Equipment mounted on deck, such as the ship's wheel, binnacle, fife rails, and so forth, may be collectively referred to as deck furniture. Weather decks in Western designs evolved from having structures fore (forward or front) and aft (rear) of the ship mostly clear; in the 19th century, pilothouses/wheelhouses and deckhouses began to appear, eventually developing into the superstructure of modern ships. Eastern designs developed earlier, with efficient middle decks and minimalist fore and aft cabin structures across a range of designs.

== Common names for decks ==
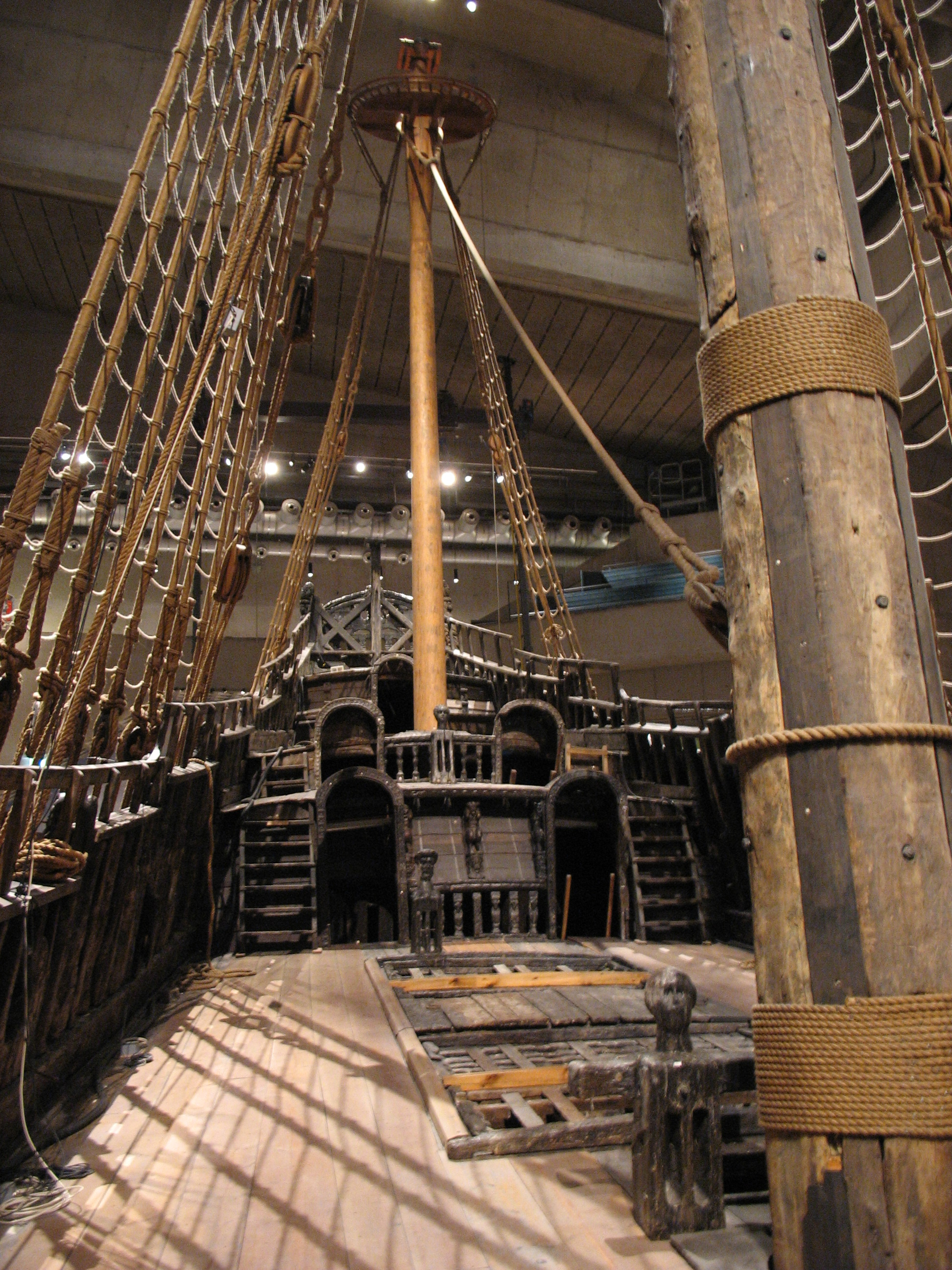
Weather deck of the Swedish 17th-century warship Vasa looking aft toward the sterncastle

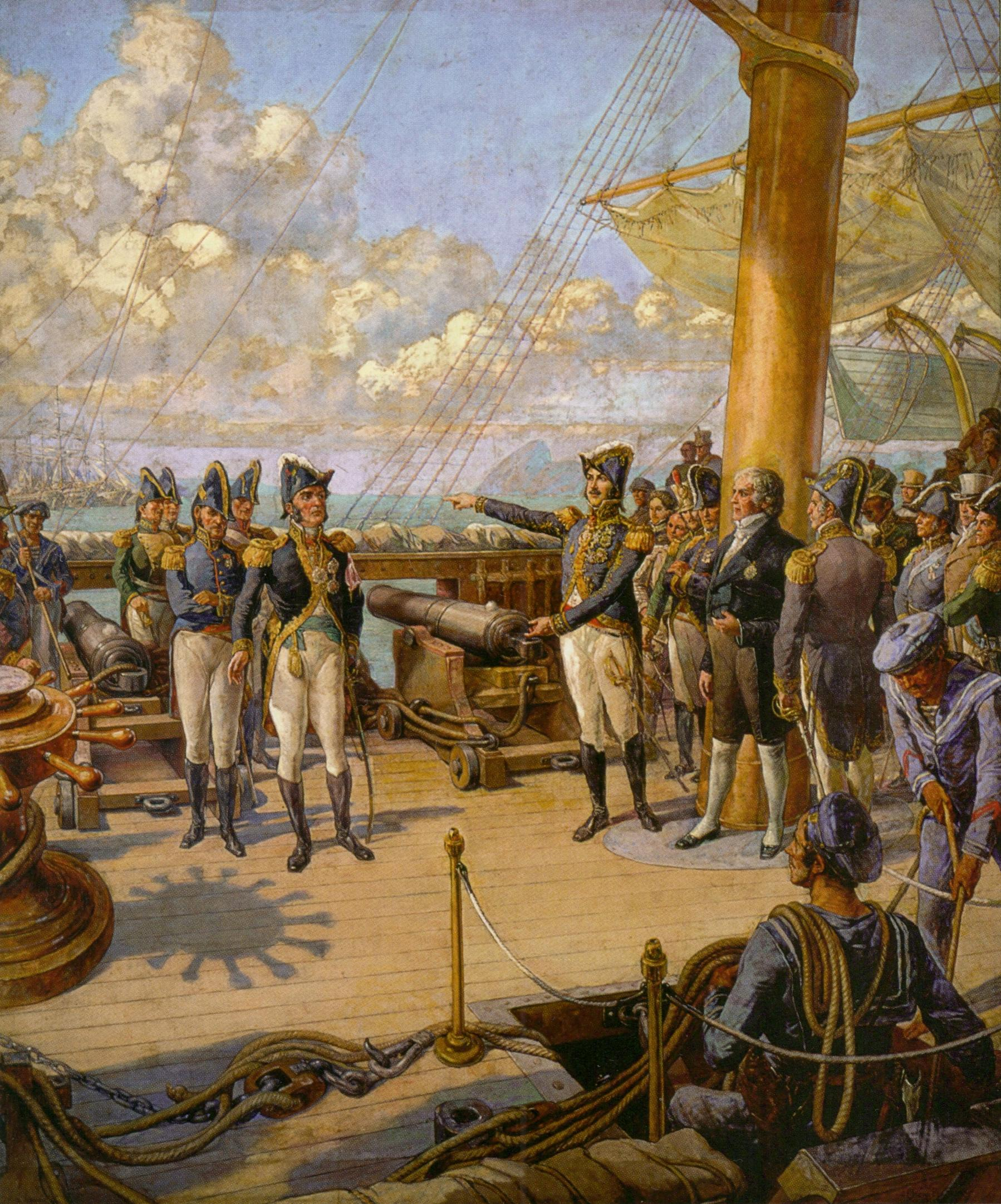
Prince Regent Pedro of Braganza (pointing) and others on the deck of the Brazilian frigate União after the failed Avilez Rebellion, 1822

In vessels having more than one deck there are various naming conventions, numerically, alphabetically, etc. However, there are also various common historical names and types of decks:

- 01 level is the term used in naval services to refer to the deck above the main deck. The next higher decks are referred to as the 02 level, the 03 level, and so on. Although these are formally called decks, they are usually referred to as levels, because they are usually incomplete decks that do not extend all the way from the stem to the stern or across the ship.
- Afterdeck an open deck area toward the stern-aft.
- Berth deck: (naval) A deck next below the gun deck, where the hammocks of the crew are slung.
- Boat deck: Especially on ships with sponsons, the deck area where lifeboats or the ship's gig are stored.
- Boiler deck: (river steamers) The passenger deck above the vessel's boilers.
- Bridge deck: (a) The deck area including the helm and navigation station, and where the Officer of the Deck/Watch will be found, also known as the conn. (b) An athwartships structure at the forward end of the cockpit with a deck, often somewhat lower than the primary deck, to prevent a pooping wave (a wave which comes over the stern and onto the deck) from entering through the companionway. May also refer to the deck of a bridge.
- Flight deck: (naval) A deck from which aircraft take off or land.
- Flush deck: Any continuous unbroken deck from stem to stern.
- Forecastle deck: A partial deck above the main deck under which the sailors have their berths, extending from the foremast to the bow.
- Freeboard deck: assigned by a classification society to determine the ship's freeboard; usually the highest continuous deck, i.e. equivalent to the main deck.
- Gun deck: (naval) on a multi-decked vessel, a deck below the upper deck where the ships' cannon were carried. The term originally referred to deck for which the primary function was the mounting of cannon to be fired in broadsides. However, on many smaller and unrated vessels the upper deck, forecastle and quarterdeck bore all of the cannons but were not referred to as the gun deck.
- Hangar deck: (naval) A deck aboard an aircraft carrier used to store and maintain aircraft.
- Half-deck: That portion of the deck next below the forecastle or quarterdeck which is between the mainmast and the cabin.
- Helicopter deck (heli or helo deck): Usually located near the stern and always kept clear of obstacles hazardous to a helicopter landing.
- Hurricane deck: (river steamers, etc.) the upper deck, usually a light deck, erected above the frame of the hull (deriving its name from the wind that always seemed to blow on the deck).
- Lido deck: Open area, typically at or near the stern of a passenger ship, housing the main outdoor swimming pool and sunbathing area.
- Lower deck: (a) the deck immediately over the hold, originally only of a ship with two decks. (b) synonym for berth deck. (c) alternative name for a secondary gun deck.
- Main deck: The principal deck of a vessel; in some ships the highest deck of the hull, usually but not always the weather deck; in sailing warships often a deck under the upper deck.
- Middle or waist deck: The upper deck amidships, the working area of the deck.
- Orlop deck: The deck or part of a deck where the cables are stowed, usually below the waterline. It is the lowest deck in a ship.
- Poop deck: The deck forming the roof of a poop or poop cabin, built on the upper deck and extending from the mizzenmast aft.
- Promenade deck: A "wrap-around porch" found on passenger ships and riverboats encircling the superstructure. This can have open railings or be enclosed in glass, or a combination. Often the entire level where this is located is referred to as the promenade deck.
- Quarterdeck: (a) The part of the upper deck abaft the mainmast, including the poop deck when there is one. Usually reserved for ship's officers, guests, and passengers. (b) (naval) The shipboard area, connected by a gangplank to a dock or another ship, where personnel arrive and depart a naval vessel in port. It is where the Officer of the Deck and his assistants are stationed, official visitors received, and personnel arrival/departure ceremonies conducted. In the event of multiple gangplanks, only one will lead to the official Quarterdeck; the others will be manned by Junior OODs or a Petty Officer of the Watch. The Quarterdeck also functions as an administrative point in port, where the ship's log is maintained, announcements are made via an electronic public address system (called the "1MC" on American navy and coast guard ships, and the "Tannoy" on others), the ship's bell rung, etc. (c) (naval) Some ships have a space named "quarterdeck", usually amidships, that normally, but situationally may not, be used for that purpose.
- Shelter deck: A lightly constructed deck over the main deck of a ship covering a space open to the weather; offering some protection from the weather but not completely enclosed.
- Side-deck: The upper deck outboard of any structures such as a coachroof or doghouse, also called a breezeway.
- Spar deck: In larger vessels during the Age of Sail, spare spars could be roped together to provide a temporary surface known as a "spar deck". These served as jury-rigged repairs for permanent decks, or as an additional platform under which to shelter goods or crew. The term was also informally applied to areas of the forecastle or quarterdeck where spare spars were stored by laying them flat against the existing decking. In the modern era the term has been used to describe the uppermost deck on flush decked vessels. On Great Lakes bulk freighters this is the term used for the deck over the cargo holds.
- Steerage: The lower deck of a ship, where the cargo is stored above the closed hold. In the late 19th and early 20th century, steamship steerage decks were used to provide the lowest cost and lowest class of travel.
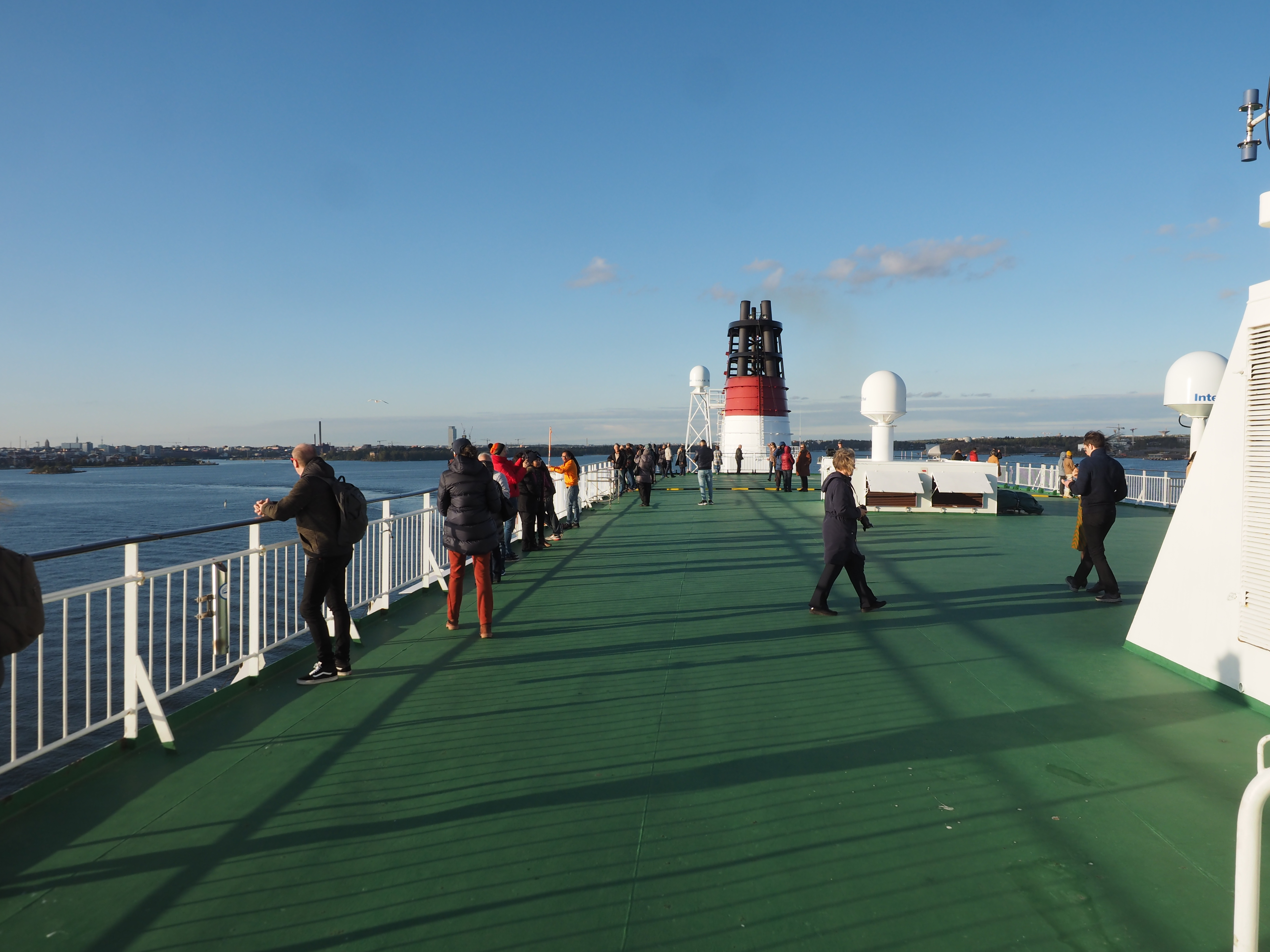
  The sun deck of MS Mariella
- Sundeck: A deck onboard passenger watercraft used for suntanning.
- Sweep deck: (naval) The aftmost deck on a minesweeper, set close to the waterline for ease in launch and recovery of equipment.
- Topgallant forecastle deck: Any raised deck occurring above the forecastle deck (see above).
- Tween deck: the storage space between the hold and the main deck, often retractable.
- Upper deck: The highest deck of the hull, extending from stem to stern.
- Vehicle deck: (naval) aboard amphibious assault ships the deck or decks used to carry vehicles, aboard civilian ferries and other commercial vessels a deck used for a similar purpose.
- Weather deck: (a) Any deck exposed to the outside. (b) The windward side-decks.
- Well deck: (a) An exposed deck (weather deck) lower than decks fore and aft. In particular it is one enclosed by bulwarks limiting flow of water and thus drainage. (b) (modern naval) A hangar-like deck located at the waterline in the stern of some amphibious assault ships, also known as a well dock. By taking on water the ship can lower the stern, flooding the well deck and allowing boats and landing craft to dock within the ship.

== Construction ==
=== Methods in wood ===
A traditional wood deck would consist of planks laid fore and aft over beams and along carlins, the seams of which are caulked and paid with tar. A yacht or other fancy boat might then have the deck canvased, with the fabric laid down in a thick layer of paint or sealant, and additional coats painted over. The wash or apron boards form the joint between the deck planking and that of the topsides, and are caulked similarly.

Modern "constructed decks" are used primarily on fiberglass, composite, and cold-molded hulls. The under structure of beams and carlins is the same as above. The decking itself is usually multiple layers of marine-grade plywood, covered over with layers of fibreglass in a plastic resin such as epoxy or polyester overlapped onto the topsides of the hull.

=== Methods in metal ===
Generally speaking, the method outlined for "constructed decks" is most similar to metal decks. The deck plating is laid over metal beams and carlins and tacked temporarily in place. The difficulty in metal construction is avoiding distortion of the plate while welding due to the high heat involved in the process. Welds are usually double pass, meaning each seam is welded twice, a time-consuming process which may take longer than building the wood deck. However, welds result in a waterproof deck which is strong and easily repairable. The deck structure is welded to the hull, making it structurally a single unit.

Because a metal deck, painted to reduce corrosion, can pick up heat from the sun, and be quite slippery and noisy to work on, a layer of wood decking or thick non-skid paint is often applied to its surface.

=== Methods in fiberglass ===
The process for building a deck in fiberglass is the same as for building a hull: a female mould is built, a layer of gel coat is sprayed in, then layers of fiberglass in resin are built up to the required deck thickness (if the deck has a core, the outer skin layers of fiberglass and resin are laid, then the core material, and finally the inner skin layers). The deck is removed from the mould and usually mechanically fastened to the hull.

Fiberglass decks are quite slick with their mirror-smooth surfaces, so a non-skid texture is often moulded into their surface, or non-skid pads glued down in working areas.

=== Rules of thumb to determine the deck scantlings ===
The thickness of the decking affects how strong the hull is, and is directly related to how thick the skin of the hull itself is, which is of course related to how large the vessel is, the kind of work it is expected to do, and the kind of weather it may reasonably be expected to endure. While a naval engineer or architect may have precise methods of determining what the scantlings should be, traditional builders used previous experiences and simpler rules-of-thumb to determine how thick the deck should be built.

The numbers derived by these formulae gives a rough number for determining the average thickness of materials based on some crude hull measurements. Below the waterline the thickness should be approximately 115% of the result, while upper topsides and decks might be reduced to 85% of the result.

- In wood – For plank thickness in inches, LOA (Length OverAll) and Beam are measured in feet. For plank thickness in mm, LOA and beam are measured in meters.
  - Plank thickness in inches${} = {\sqrt{\text{LOA}}+\text{beam} \over 16}$
  - Plank thickness in mm${} = \left[ \sqrt{\text{LOA}\cdot 3.28}+(\text{beam} \cdot 3.28)\cdot 1.58 \right]$
- In fiberglass – For skin thickness in inches, LWL (Length WaterLine) is in feet. For skin thickness in mm, LWL is in meters.
  - Skin thickness (inches)${} = 0.07 + {\text{LWL}\over150}$
  - Skin thickness (mm)${} = 1.8 + {\text{LWL}\over1.8}$
- In fiberglass sandwich – First determine the skin thickness as single skin, then multiply by modifiers for inner skin, outer skin, and core thicknesses. Cored decks might be modified even thicker, 2.6–2.7, to increase stiffness.
  - Inner skin modifier = 0.3
  - Outer skin modifier = 0.4
  - Core modifier = 2.2

– Source:

== Deck covering of modern yachts ==
=== Teak wood ===
Teak wood is a popular choice for modern yacht decking due to its natural durability, water resistance, and aesthetic appeal. Known for its ability to withstand harsh marine environments, teak requires relatively simple maintenance while providing a classic look. Its natural oils make it resistant to rot, pests, and UV damage, and over time, it develops a silver-gray patina. Teak decks are also non-slip when wet, making them practical for safety in marine settings. Teak decking can be expensive and requires regular cleaning to maintain its appearance.

=== Alternative covers / Plastic teak imitation ===
Alternative yacht deck materials have grown in popularity due to their affordability, lower maintenance, and environmental benefits compared to traditional teak. Some common alternatives include:

- Synthetic teak: Made from PVC or other polymers, synthetic teak mimics the look of real teak but requires much less maintenance. It is resistant to UV rays, stains, and water damage, making it durable for marine use.
- Cork: Lightweight and eco-friendly, cork is naturally non-slip, resistant to water, and comfortable to walk on. It is also an excellent thermal and sound insulator.
- Bamboo: An increasingly popular option due to its sustainability. Bamboo is durable and environmentally friendly but requires proper treatment to ensure resistance to moisture and rot.
- Eva foam: Common on racing yachts, these materials are practical, lightweight, and easy to implement. They provide excellent grip but may not have the same aesthetic appeal as wood or wood-like alternatives.
