= Flight deck =

Landing/take off surface of an aircraft carrier

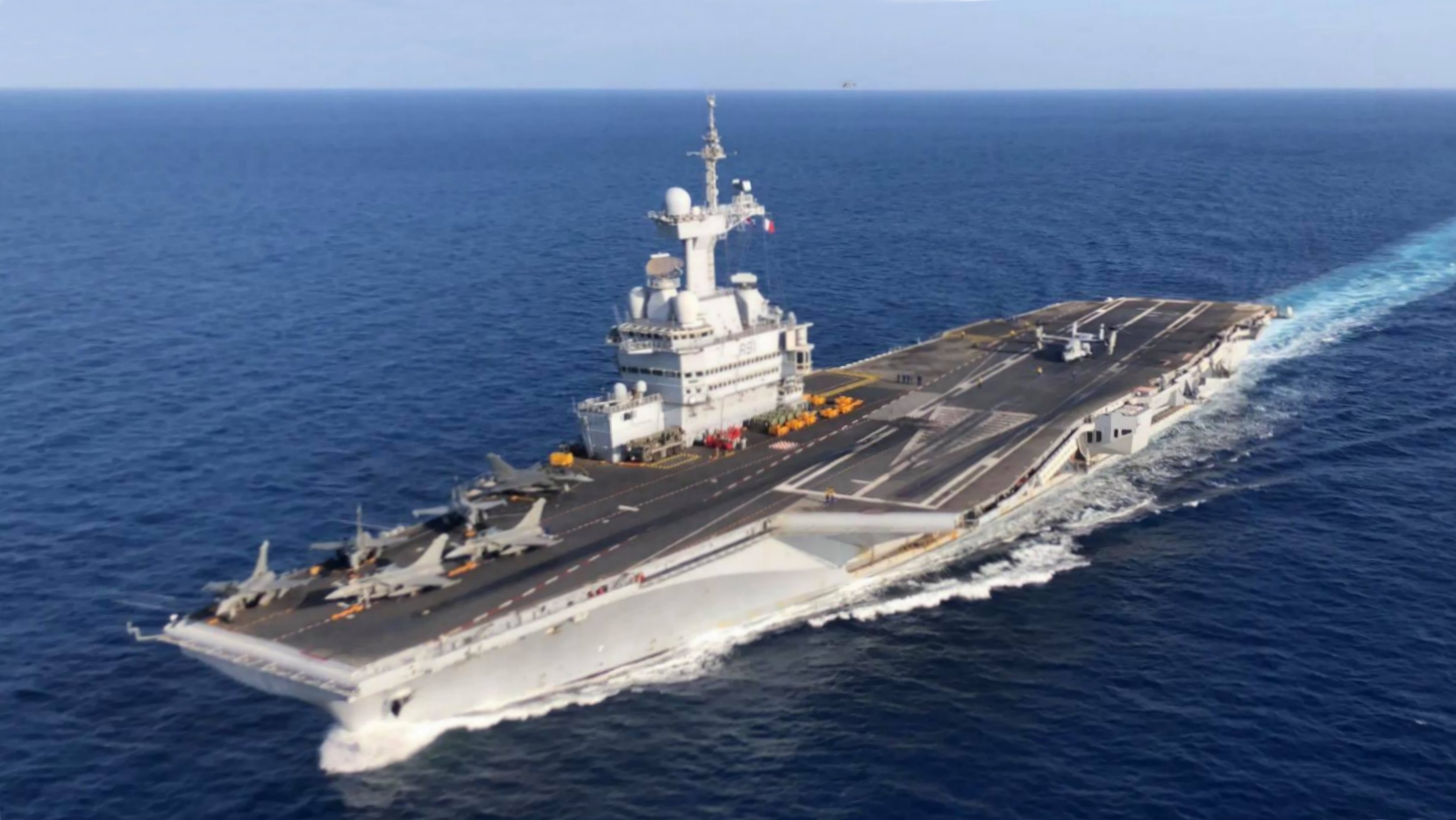
Flight deck of Charles de Gaulle. Catapults are installed on aircraft carriers in three countries.

Various types of flight deck configurations, some of which include ski-jump ramps which can be found on aircraft carriers in several countries.

The flight deck of an aircraft carrier is the surface on which its aircraft take off and land, essentially a miniature airfield at sea. On smaller naval ships which do not have aviation as a primary mission, the landing area for helicopters and other VTOL aircraft is also referred to as the flight deck. The official U.S. Navy term for these vessels is "air-capable ships".

Flight decks have been in use upon ships since 1910, the American pilot Eugene Ely being the first individual to take off from a warship. Initially consisting of wooden ramps built over the forecastle of capital ships, a number of battlecruisers, including the British HMS Furious and Courageous class, the American USS Lexington and Saratoga, and the Japanese Akagi and battleship Kaga, were converted to aircraft carriers during the interwar period. The first aircraft carrier to feature a full-length flight deck, akin to the configuration of the modern vessels, was the converted liner HMS Argus, which entered service in 1918. The armoured flight deck was another innovation pioneered by the Royal Navy during the 1930s. Early landing arrangements relied on the low speed and landing speed of the era's aircraft, being simply "caught" by a team of deck-hands in a fairly hazardous arrangement, but these became impractical as heavier aircraft with higher landing speeds emerged; thus an arrangement of arrestor cables and tailhooks soon became the favoured approach.

During the Cold War era, numerous innovations were introduced to the flight deck. The angled flight deck, invented by Dennis Cambell of the Royal Navy, was one prominent design feature that drastically simplified aircraft recovery and deck movements, enabling landing and launching operations to be performed simultaneously rather than interchangeably; it also better handled the higher landing speeds of jet-powered aircraft. In 1952, HMS Triumph became the first aircraft carrier to trial the angled flight deck. Another advance was the ski-jump, which fitted an angled ramp on the flight deck near the end of the aircraft's takeoff run; the change greatly reduced the distance required and became particularly useful for operating STOVL aircraft. Furthermore, various unsuccessful concepts to replace or complement the conventional flight deck have emerged over the years, from the flexible flight deck to the submarine aircraft carrier and flying boat fighter aircraft.

== Evolution ==
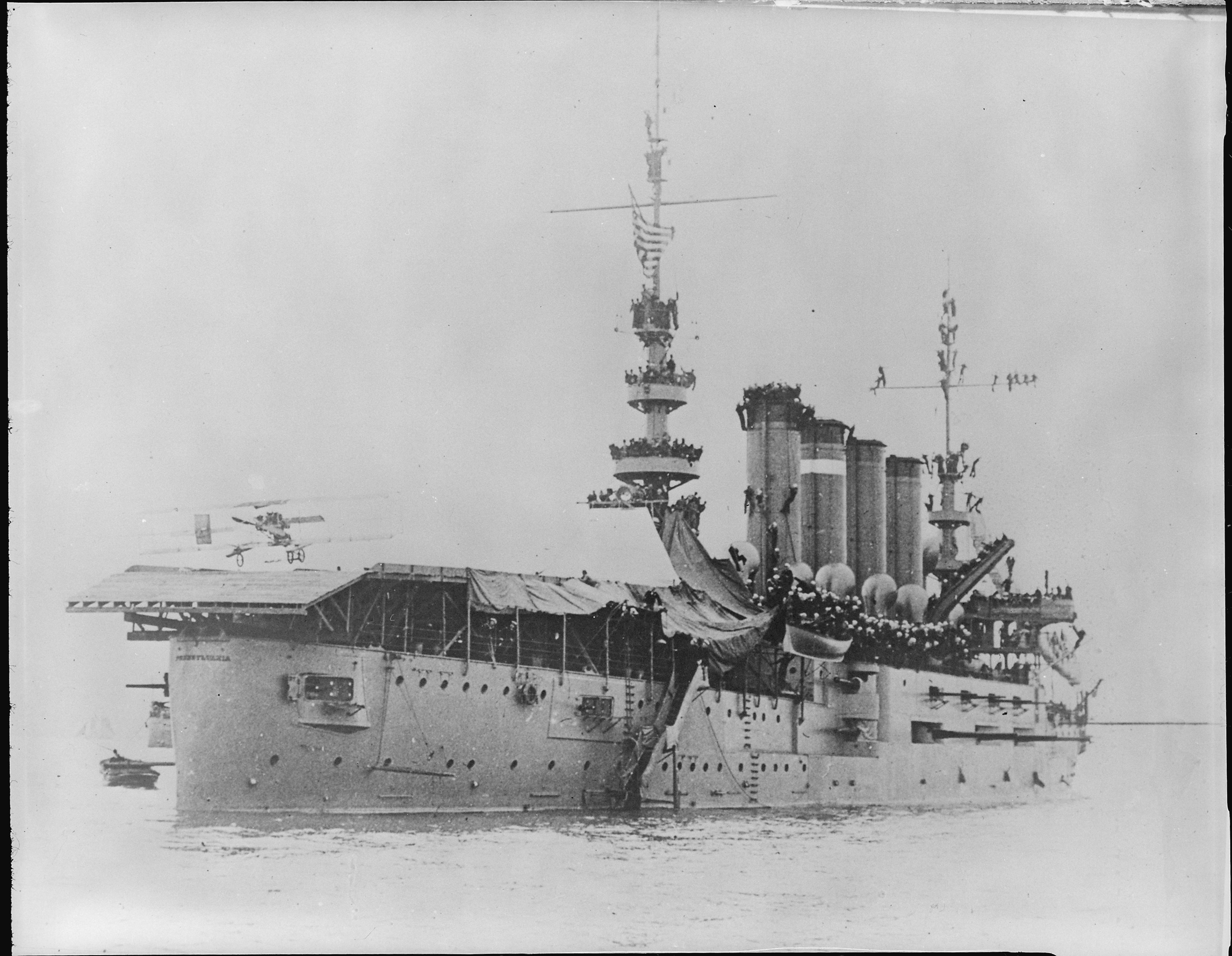
Eugene Ely's first landing, on the armored cruiser USS Pennsylvania

=== Early ===
The first flight decks were inclined wooden ramps built over the forecastle of warships. Eugene Ely made the first fixed-wing aircraft take-off from a warship from USS Birmingham on 14 November 1910.

Two months later, on 18 January 1911, Ely landed his Curtiss pusher plane on a platform on Pennsylvania anchored in San Francisco Bay using the first tailhook system, designed and built by circus performer and aviator Hugh Robinson. Ely told a reporter: "It was easy enough. I think the trick could be successfully turned nine times out of ten." On 9 May 1912, Commander Charles Samson became the first man to take off from a ship which was underway when he flew his Short S.27 off HMS Hibernia, which was steaming at 10.5 kn (12.1 mph; 19.4 km/h).

Because the take-off speed of early aircraft was so low, it was possible for an aircraft to make a very short take off when the launching ship was steaming into the wind. Later, removable "flying-off platforms" appeared on the gun turrets of battleships and battlecruisers starting with HMS Repulse, allowing aircraft to be flown off for scouting purposes, although there was no chance of recovery.

On 2 August 1917, while performing trials, Squadron Commander Edwin Harris Dunning landed a Sopwith Pup successfully on board the flying-off platform of HMS Furious, becoming the first person to land an aircraft on a moving ship. However, on his third attempt, a tire burst as he attempted to land, causing the aircraft to go over the side, killing him; thus Dunning also has the dubious distinction of being the first person to die in an aircraft carrier landing accident.

The landing arrangements on Furious were highly unsatisfactory. In order to land, aircraft had to maneuver around the superstructure. Furious was therefore returned to dockyard hands to have a 300 ft (91 m) deck added aft for landing, on top of a new hangar. The central superstructure remained, however, and turbulence caused by it badly affected the landing deck.

=== Full length ===
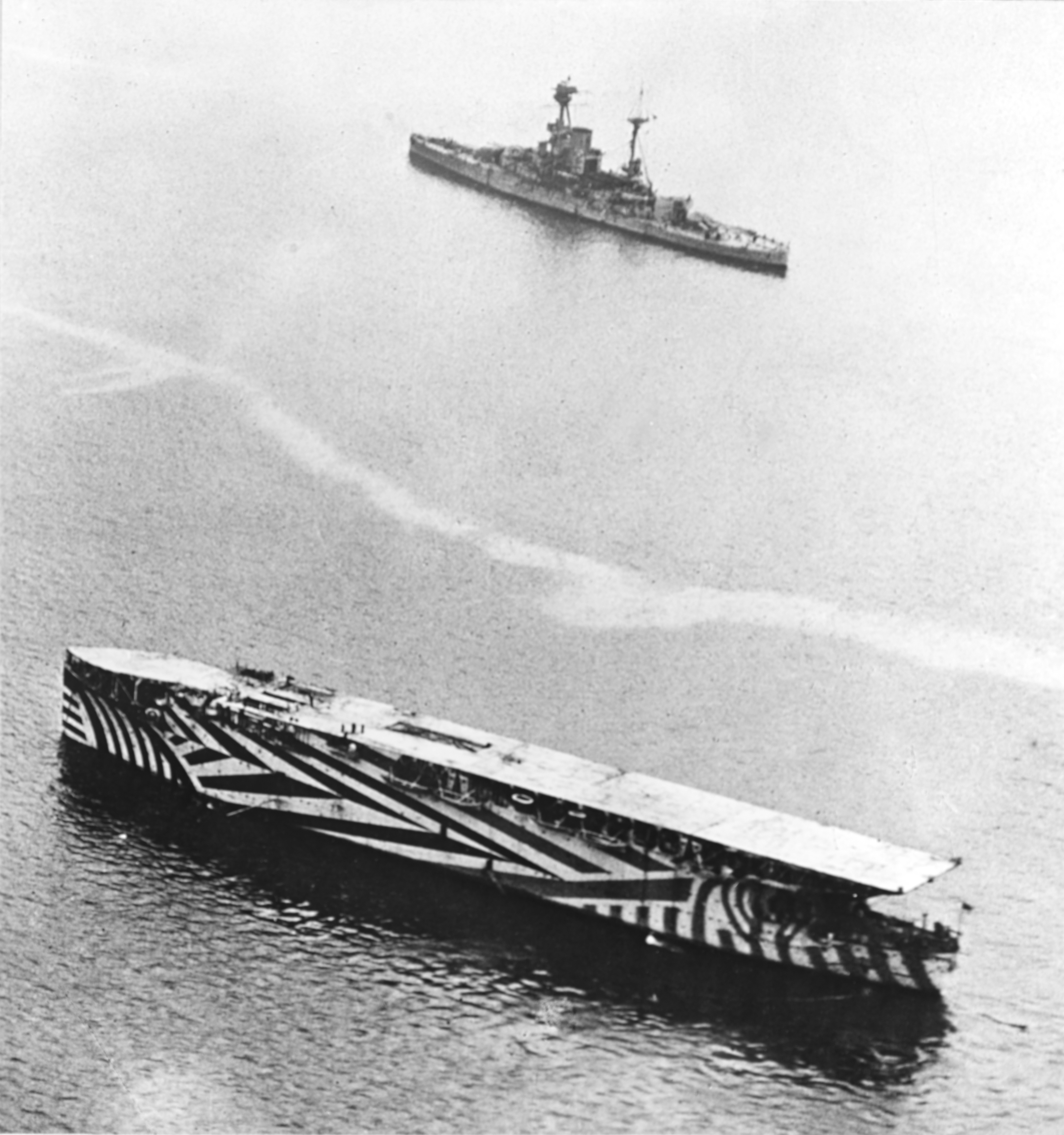
HMS Argus showing the full-length flight deck from bow to stern

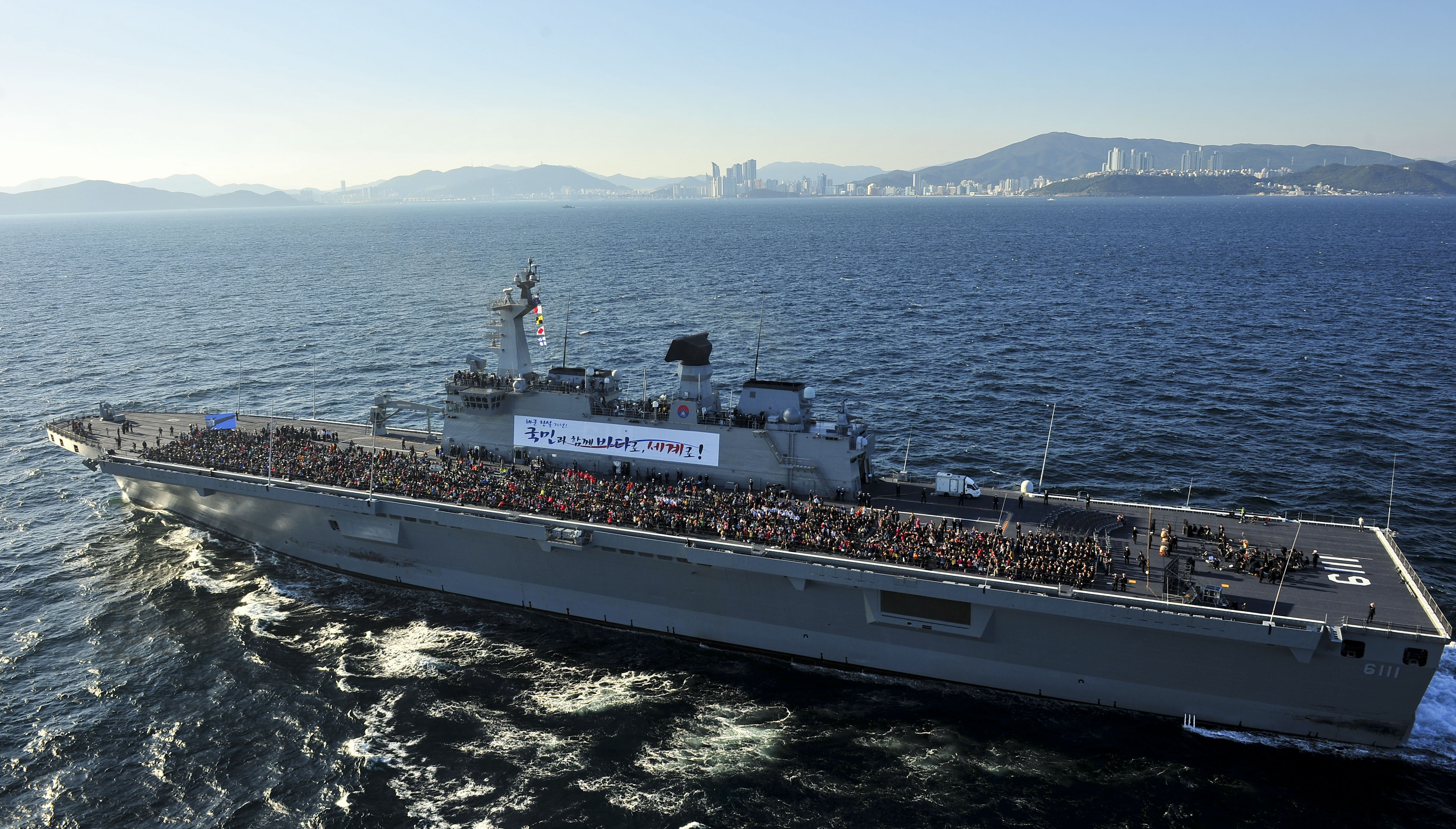
ROKS Dokdo's full length flight deck

The first aircraft carrier that began to show the configuration of the modern vessel was the converted liner HMS Argus, which had a large flat wooden deck added over the entire length of the hull, giving a combined landing and take-off deck unobstructed by superstructure turbulence. Because of her unobstructed flight deck, Argus had no fixed conning tower and no funnel. Rather, exhaust gases were trunked down the side of the ship and ejected under the fantail of the flight deck (which, despite arrangements to disperse the gases, gave an unwelcome "lift" to aircraft immediately prior to landing).

The lack of a command position and funnel was unsatisfactory, and Argus was used to experiment with various ideas to remedy the solution. A photograph in 1917 shows her with a canvas mock-up of a starboard "island" superstructure and funnel. This was placed on the starboard side because the rotary engines of some early aircraft created torque which pulled the nose left, meaning an aircraft naturally yawed to port on take-off; therefore, it was desirable that they turned away from the fixed superstructure. This became the typical aircraft carrier arrangement and was used in the next British carriers, Hermes and Eagle.

After World War I, battlecruisers that otherwise would have been discarded under the Washington Naval Treaty—such as the British HMS Furious and Courageous class, the American USS Lexington and Saratoga, and the Japanese Akagi and battleship Kaga—were converted to carriers along the above lines. Being large and fast they were perfectly suited to this role. The heavy armoring and scantlings and low speed of the converted battleship Eagle served to be something of a handicap in practice.

Because the military effectiveness of aircraft carriers was then unknown, early ships were typically equipped with cruiser-calibre guns to aid in their defense if surprised by enemy warships. These guns were generally removed in World War II and replaced with anti-aircraft guns, as carrier doctrine developed the "task force" (later called "battle group") model, where the carrier's defense against surface ships would be a combination of escorting warships and its own aircraft.

In ships of this configuration, the hangar deck was the strength deck and an integral part of the hull, and the hangar and light steel flight deck were considered to be part of the superstructure. Such ships were still being built into the late 1940s, classic examples being the U.S. Navy's Essex and Ticonderoga-class carriers. However, in 1936, the Royal Navy began construction of the Illustrious class.

In these ships, the flight deck was the strength deck, an integral part of the hull, and was heavily armored to protect the ship and her air complement. The flight deck as the strength deck was adopted for later construction. This was necessitated by the ever-increasing size of the ships, from the 13,000 ton USS Langley in 1922 to over 100,000 tons in the latest Nimitz-class and Gerald R. Ford-class carriers.

=== Armored ===
When aircraft carriers supplanted battleships as the primary fleet capital ship, there were two schools of thought on the question of armor protection being included into the flight deck. The United States Navy (USN) initially favored unarmored flight decks because they maximized aircraft carrier hangar and flight deck size, which in turn maximized aircraft capacity in the hangar, and on the flight deck, in the form of a permanent "deck park" for a large proportion of the aircraft carried.

In 1936 the Royal Navy developed the armored flight deck aircraft carrier which also enclosed the hangar sides and ends with armor. The addition of armor to the flight deck offered aircraft below some protection against aerial bombs while the armored hangar sides and ends helped to minimize damage and casualties from explosions or fires within or outside the hangar. The addition of armor to the hangar forced a reduction in top-weight, so the hangar height was reduced, and this restricted the types of aircraft that these ships could carry, although the Royal Navy's armored carriers did carry spare aircraft in the hangar overheads.

The armor also reduced the length of the flight deck, reducing the maximum aircraft capacity of the armored flight deck aircraft carrier. Additionally, Royal Navy aircraft carriers did not use a permanent deck park until approximately 1943; before then the aircraft capacity of RN aircraft carriers was limited to their hangar capacity.

The 23,000-ton British Illustrious class had a hangar capacity for 36 Swordfish-sized aircraft and a single 458-by-62-by-16-foot (139.6 m × 18.9 m × 4.9 m) hangar, but carried up to 57 aircraft with a permanent deck park, while the 23,400-ton Implacable class featured increased hangar capacity with a 458-by-62-by-14-foot (139.6 m × 18.9 m × 4.3 m) upper hangar and the addition of a 208-by-62-by-14-foot (63.4 m × 18.9 m × 4.3 m) lower hangar, forward of the after elevator, which had a total capacity of 52 Swordfish-sized aircraft or a mix of 48 late-war aircraft in the hangar plus 24 aircraft in a permanent deck park, but carried up to 81 aircraft with a deck park.

The 27,500-ton USN Essex class had a 654-by-70-by-17.5-foot (199.3 m × 21.3 m × 5.3 m) hangar that was designed to handle a mix of 72 prewar USN aircraft. but carried up to 104 late-war aircraft using both the hangar and a permanent deck park. The experience of World War II caused the USN to change their design policy in favor of armored flight decks on much larger ships: "The main armor carried on Enterprise is the heavy armored flight deck. This was to prove a significant factor in the catastrophic fire and explosions that occurred on Enterprise's flight deck in 1969. The US Navy learned its lesson the hard way during World War II when all its carriers had only armored hangar decks. All attack carriers built since the Midway class have had armored flight decks."

== Landing ==
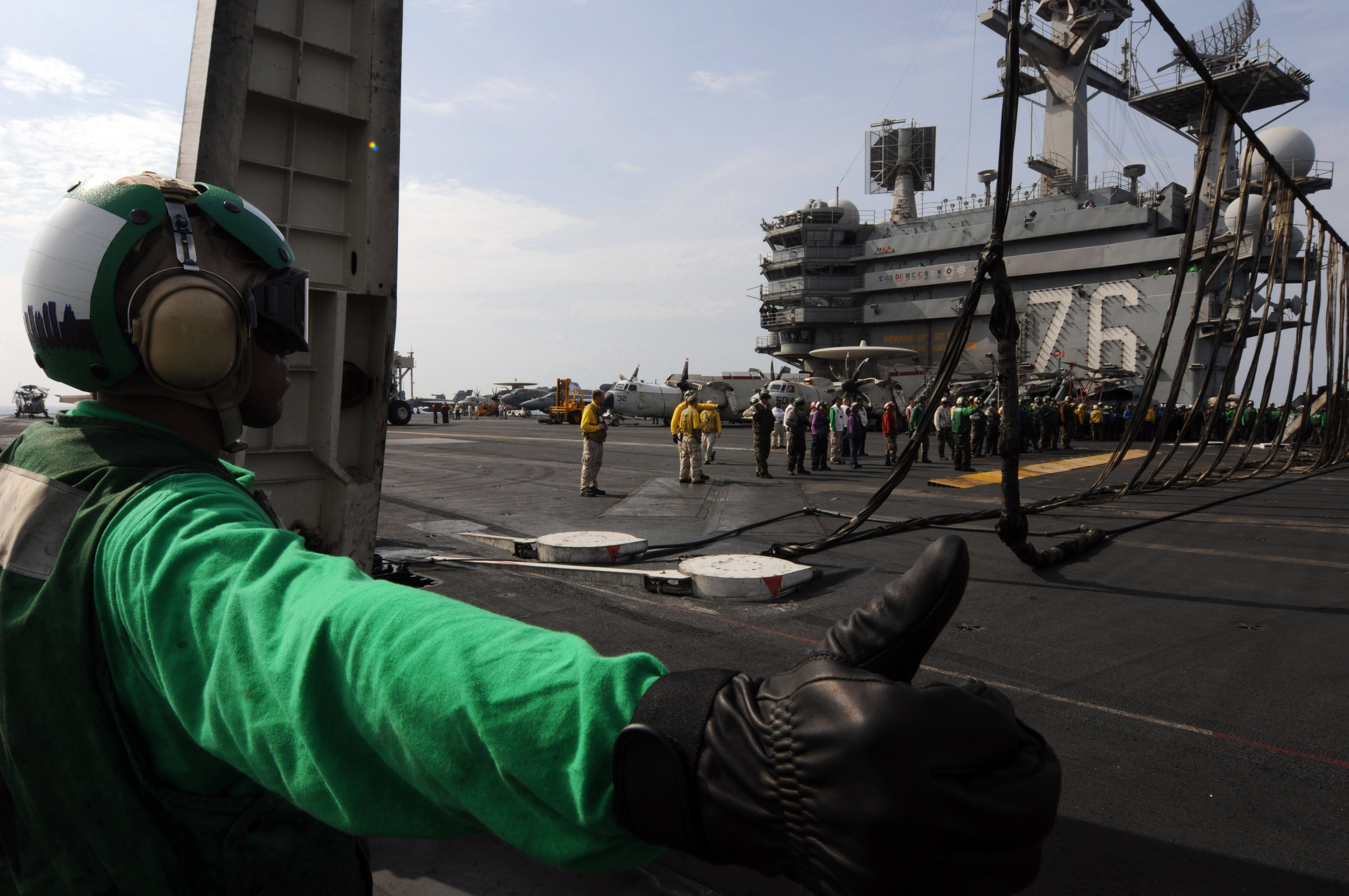
A barricade is raised on USS Ronald Reagan. Barricade usage is a rare emergency measure.

Landing arrangements were originally primitive, with aircraft simply being "caught" by a team of deck-hands who would run out from the wings of the flight deck and grab a part of the aircraft to slow it down. This dangerous procedure was only possible with early aircraft of low weight and landing speed. Arrangements of nets served to catch the aircraft should the latter fail, although this was likely to cause structural damage. A non-skid deck surface is important to prevent aircraft from sliding on a wet deck as the ship rolls.

Landing larger and faster aircraft on a flight deck was made possible through the use of arresting cables installed on the flight deck and a tailhook installed on the aircraft. Early carriers had a very large number of arrestor cables or "wires". Current U.S. Navy carriers have three or four steel cables stretched across the deck at 20 ft (6.1 m) intervals which bring a plane, traveling at 150 mph (240 km/h), to a complete stop in about 320 ft (98 m).

The cables are set to stop each aircraft at the same place on the deck, regardless of the size or weight of the plane. During World War II, large net barriers would be erected across the flight deck so aircraft could be parked on the forward part of the deck and recovered on the after part. This allowed increased complements but resulted in a lengthened launch and recovery cycle as aircraft were shuffled around the carrier to allow take-off or landing operations.

A barricade is an emergency system used if a normal arrestment cannot be made. Barricade webbing engages the wings of the landing aircraft, and momentum is transferred to the arresting engine.

== Cold War innovations ==
=== Angled flight deck ===
Animated representation of a missed approach on angled flight deck, Centaur class, showing how the offset recovery area allows for simultaneous launch and recovery operations.

The angled flight deck was invented by Royal Navy Captain (later Rear Admiral) Dennis Cambell, as an outgrowth of design study initially begun in the winter of 1944–1945. A committee of senior Royal Navy officers decided that the future of naval aviation was in jets, whose higher speeds required that the carriers be modified to suit their needs.

In this type of deck—also called a "skewed deck", a "canted deck", a "waist angle deck", and the "angle"—the aft part is widened, and a separate runway, dedicated to landing, lies at an angle oblique to the centreline.

The angled flight deck was designed with the higher landing speeds of jet aircraft in mind, which would have required the entire length of a centreline flight deck to stop. The design also allowed concurrent launch and recovery operations, and allowed aircraft failing to connect with the arrestor cables to abort the landing, accelerate, and relaunch (bolter) without risk to parked or launching aircraft.

Representation of the Nimitz-class carrier USS Dwight D. Eisenhower illustrating how increasing the offset angle of a carrier's recovery area allows the use of two catapults during launch and recovery operations.

The redesign allowed for several other design and operational modifications, including the mounting of a larger island (improving both ship-handling and flight control), drastically simplified aircraft recovery and deck movement (aircraft now launched from the bow and landed on the angled flight deck, leaving a large open area amidships for arming and fueling), and damage control. Because of its utility in flight operations, the angled deck is now a defining feature of STOBAR and CATOBAR equipped aircraft carriers.

The angled flight deck was first tested in 1952 on HMS Triumph by painting angled deck markings onto the centerline of the flight deck for touch-and-go landings. This was also tested on USS Midway the same year.

Despite the new markings, in both cases the arresting gear and barriers were still aligned with the centerline of the original deck. From September to December 1952, USS Antietam had a rudimentary sponson installed for true angled-deck tests, allowing for full arrested landings, which proved during trials to be superior. In 1953, Antietam trained with both U.S. and British naval units, proving the worth of the angled-deck concept. HMS Centaur was modified with an overhanging angled flight deck in 1954.

The U.S. Navy installed the decks as part of the SCB-125 upgrade for the Essex class and SCB-110/110A for the Midway class. In February 1955, HMS Ark Royal became the first carrier to be constructed and launched with an angled deck, rather than having one retrofitted. This was followed in the same year by the lead ships of the British Majestic class (HMAS Melbourne) and the American Forrestal class (USS Forrestal).

=== Ski-jump ===
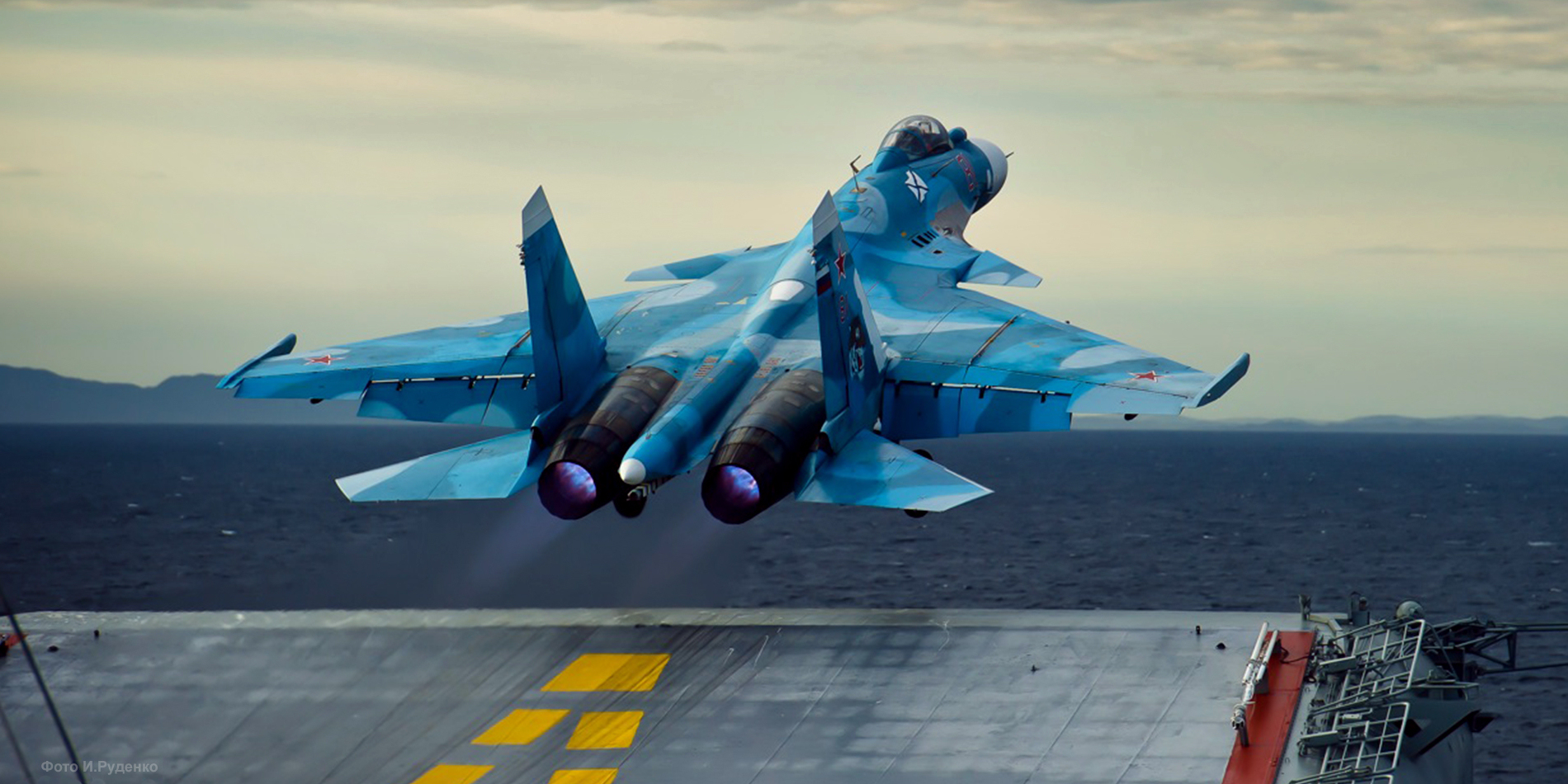
A Russian Navy Su-33 taking off from the ski-jump on the deck of Admiral Kuznetsov in 2012.

A ski-jump converts part of the aircraft's forward motion to upward motion through the use of a curved ramp located at the end of the flight deck. As a result, the aircraft starts out its flight with a positive rate-of-climb. This allows heavier aircraft to take off even though the lift generated is less. Gravity causes the upward velocity to decline, but the aircraft continues to accelerate after leaving the flight deck. By the time the upward velocity has decayed to zero, the aircraft is going fast enough to attain stable flight.

Ski-jumps can be used to enable conventional aircraft to takeoff on STOBAR aircraft carriers. They can also enable heavier payloads for STOVL aircraft.

=== Flexible deck ===
An idea tested, but never put into service, was the flexible or inflated, air-cushioned, "rubber deck". In the early jet age it was recognised that eliminating the landing gear for carrier borne aircraft would improve the flight performance and range, since the space taken by the landing gear could be used to hold additional fuel tanks. This led to the concept of a deck that would absorb the energy of landing.

With the introduction of jet aircraft the risk of damaging propellers was no longer an issue, though take off would require some sort of launching cradle. Tests were carried out with a de Havilland Sea Vampire flown by test pilot Eric "Winkle" Brown onto a flexible deck fitted to HMS Warrior.

The deck consisted of a rubberised sheet fully supported on multiple layers of pressurised fire hose. Supermarine designed its Type 508 for rubber deck landings. The flexible deck idea was found to be technically feasible but was abandoned, as the weight of carrier aircraft increased and there were always doubts about the ability of an average pilot to land in this way. The Type 508 was subsequently developed into a conventional carrier aircraft, the Supermarine Scimitar.

The US Navy evaluated a shore-based flexible deck made by Firestone Tire and Rubber Co. using two modified Grumman F9F-7 Cougars. Three US pilots had participated in the British flexible deck trials at Farnborough and the US Navy, despite liaison with the British, partially redid the Farnborough trials, with 23 landings at Patuxent River, before cancelling the project in March 1956 for similar reasons.

== Alternatives ==
During the Cold War era, multiple unorthodox alternatives to the conventional flight deck were proposed and, in some cases, experimented with.

The Shipborne Containerised Air-defence System (SCADS) was a proposed modular kit to convert a RO-RO or container ship into aviation vessels, with one scheme allowing a container ship to be converted to a STOVL aircraft carrier in two days during an emergency and quick removal after use for storage. A prefabricated flight deck and ski jump would allow six Sea Harriers and two helicopters to be operated, with shipping containers providing hangarage for the aircraft and housing their support systems and personnel as well as defensive systems and missiles. Several variants of the SCADS concept were devised for different missions roles; one implementation was tailored towards helicopter operations for example. It was effectively a modern equivalent to the Second World War-era merchant aircraft carrier.

The Skyhook system was developed by British Aerospace, involving the use of a crane with a top mating mechanism hung over the sea to catch and release VTOL aircraft, such as the Harrier jump jet. The system could be installed on ships of various configurations and sizes, even those as small as frigates, enabling virtually any Royal Navy ship to deploy a handful of Harriers. It was intended for the Skyhook to enable not only the launch and recovery of such aircraft, but to enable rapid rearming and refuelling operations to be performed. The system was marketed to various foreign customers into the 1990s, such as to enable Japan's fleet of helicopter destroyers to operate Harriers by installing the Skyhook on board. Perhaps the most elaborate implementation proposed was the application of the Skyhook to large submarines, such as the Russian Typhoon class, to produce a submarine aircraft carrier.

The Saunders-Roe SR.A/1 was a prototype jet-propelled flying boat fighter, developed during the 1940s with the intention of eliminating the monopoly held by aircraft carriers on launching jet fighters. Described as being the first water-based aircraft to harness jet propulsion in the world, the SR.A/1 attracted interest from both British and American officials, with data on the project being transferred. However, officials concluded that the concept had been rendered obsolete in comparison to increasingly capable land-based fighters, together with the inability to resolve engine difficulties, compelling a termination of work. During June 1951, the SR.A/1 prototype (TG263) flew for the last time.

During the early 1950s, Saunders-Roe worked on a new fighter design, designated Project P.121, that featured skis — aircraft publication Flight referred to it as the "Saunders-Roe Hydroski" — with the aim of bringing its performance closer to that of land-based aircraft. By adopting hydroskis and dispensing with the hull approach of the SR.A/1, no concessions to hydrodynamic requirements were imposed upon the fuselage. On 29 January 1955, the company decided not to proceed with the construction of a prototype, the proposal having not attracted any official support.

The Convair F2Y Sea Dart was a supersonic seaplane jet fighter that had skis rather than wheels. In the late 1940s, the United States Navy feared that supersonic aircraft would stall at low speeds required for a carrier arresting gear, and therefore would not be able to land on a conventional aircraft carrier. The Sea Dart would land on (smooth) water; then be lowered and raised from the sea via crane. The Navy also considered combining the Sea Dart with the unorthodox approach of a submarine aircraft carrier that could carry up to three such aircraft inside purpose-built pressure chambers. They would have been raised by a portside elevator aft of the sail and either take off on their own from a smooth sea or be catapult launched from the aft in a higher sea. During the test flight phase, the hydro-skis generated violent vibrations during takeoff and landing, while a fatal crash caused by structural failure also marred the programme; the Navy opted to cancel all production aircraft.

The United States Navy held considerable interest in the submarine aircraft carrier concept during the late 1940s. A study performed in 1946 envisioned very large submarines, ranging from 600 ft (180 m) to 750 ft (230 m) in length, to carry two XA2J Super Savage bombers for the strategic nuclear strike mission, or alternatively four F2H Banshee fighters. Another proposal would have involved the conversion of redundant Second World War-era fleet submarines to enable carriage and launch of a seaplane model of the Douglas A-4 Skyhawk attack aircraft, which would have been equipped with hydro-skis for takeoff similar to those of the Sea Dart.

== Tasks ==
On US Navy aircraft carrier flight decks tasks are indicated by different jersey colors:

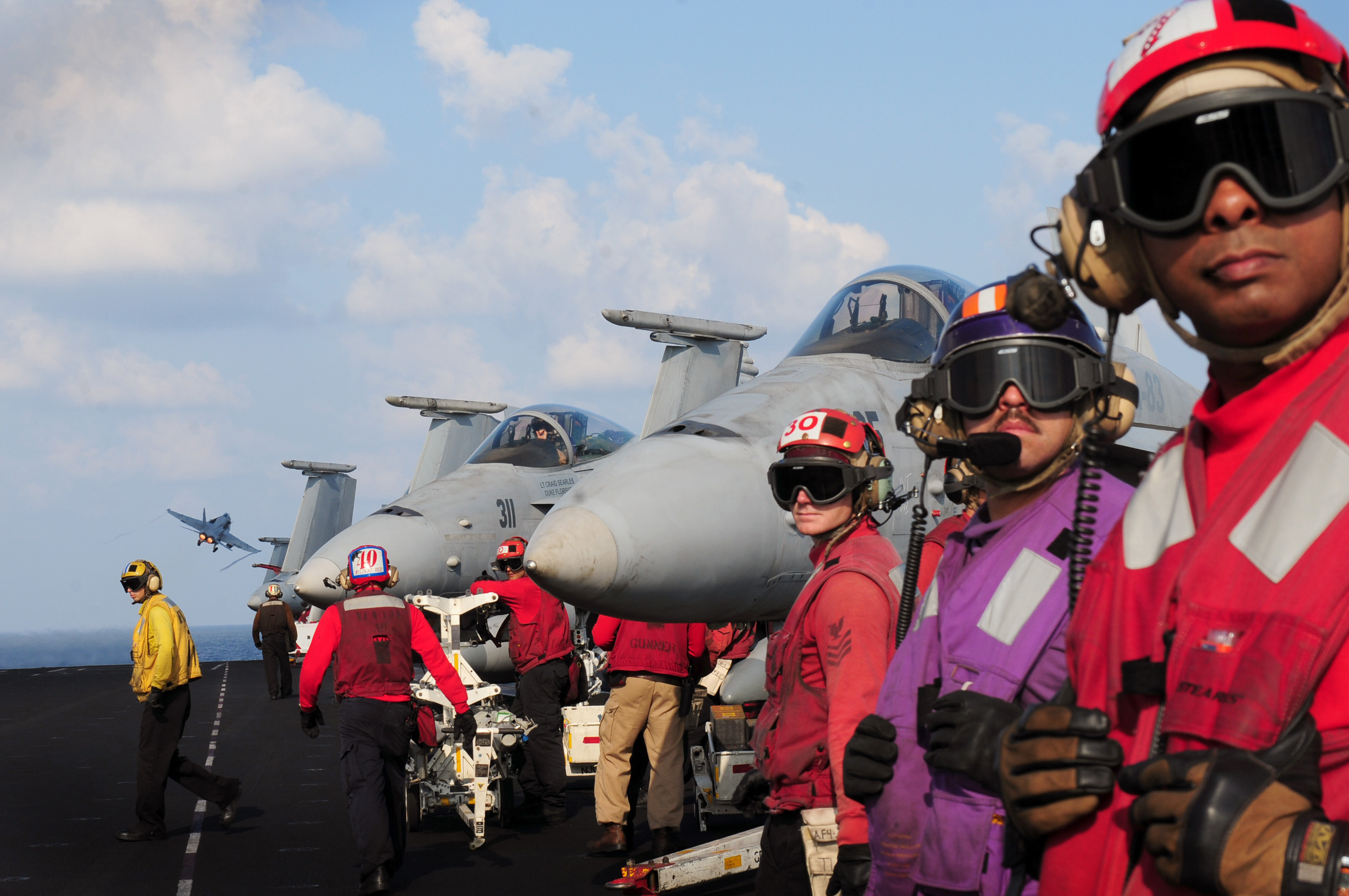
Yellow, brown, red and purple jersey colors on USS Dwight D. Eisenhower

US aircraft carrier: jack colors and tasks
Color	Role
Yellow	Aircraft handling officer; Catapult and arresting gear officer; Plane director – responsible for all movement of all aircraft on the flight/hangar deck
Green	Catapult and arresting gear crew; Visual landing aid electrician; Air wing maintainer; Air wing quality controller; Cargo-handler; Ground support equipment (GSE) troubleshooter; Hook runner; Photographer's mate; Helicopter landing signal enlisted personnel (LSE)
Red	Ordnance handler; Crash and salvage crew; Explosive ordnance disposal (EOD); Firefighter and damage control party
Purple	Aviation fuel handler
Blue	Trainee plane handler; Chocks and chains – entry-level flight-deck workers under the yellowshirts; Aircraft elevator operator; Tractor driver; Messengers and phone talker
Brown	Air wing plane captain – air wing squadron personnel who prepare aircraft for flight; Air wing line leading petty officer
White	Quality assurance (QA); Squadron plane inspector; Landing signal officer (LSO); Air transfer officer (ATO); Liquid oxygen (LOX) crew; Safety observer; Medical personnel (white with Red Cross emblem)

== See also ==
- Aircraft catapult
- Helicopter deck
- Modern United States Navy carrier air operations
