= Belaying pin =

Element of ship's rigging

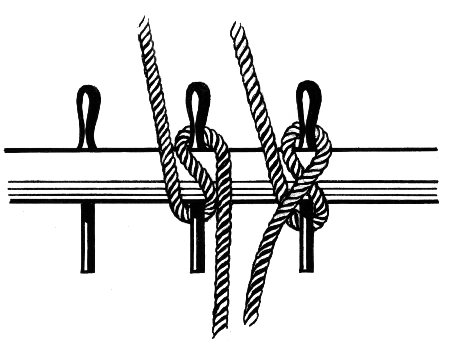
Properly securing a line to a belaying pin starts by leading the line under and behind the base of the pin to begin the figure-8 pattern

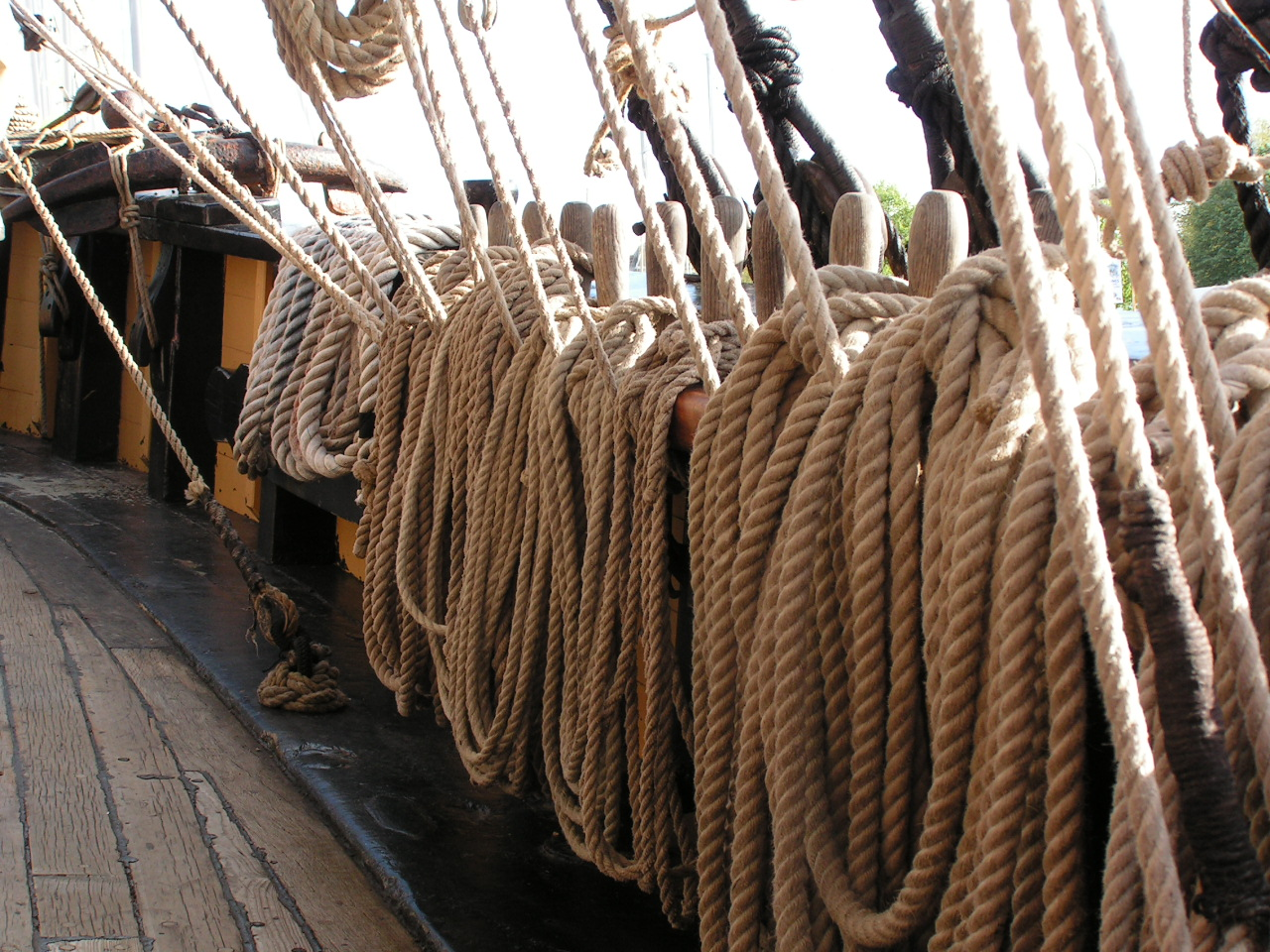
Lines coiled and secured by belaying pins

A belaying pin is a solid metal or wooden device used on traditionally rigged sailing vessels to secure lines of running rigging. Largely replaced on most modern vessels by cleats, they are still used, particularly on square rigged ships.

A belaying pin is composed of a round handle and cylindrical shaft. The shaft is inserted into a hole in various strategically located wooden pinrails (lining the inside of the bulwarks, surrounding the base of masts, or free-standing, called fife rails) up to the base of the handle. A line is then led under and behind the base of the pin then round the top in a Figure-8 pattern till at least four turns are complete.

Excess line is coiled and stored neatly by taking a bight from the upper part of the final strand, looping it over and round beneath the coil, then twisting it once or more before slipping the twisted end over the top of the belaying pin to secure the coil in place.
