= Non-skid =

Surface applied to the deck of a ship to increase friction and grip

Non-skid is a surface applied to the deck of a ship to increase the coefficient of friction and reduce the probability of footwear or vehicle tires sliding along a smooth wet surface. When decks are painted for protection against wear and corrosion, non-skid may be formed by either mixing a granular material like sand into the paint prior to application, or by sprinkling dry sand onto a newly painted surface before the paint hardens by drying or curing.

== Examples ==
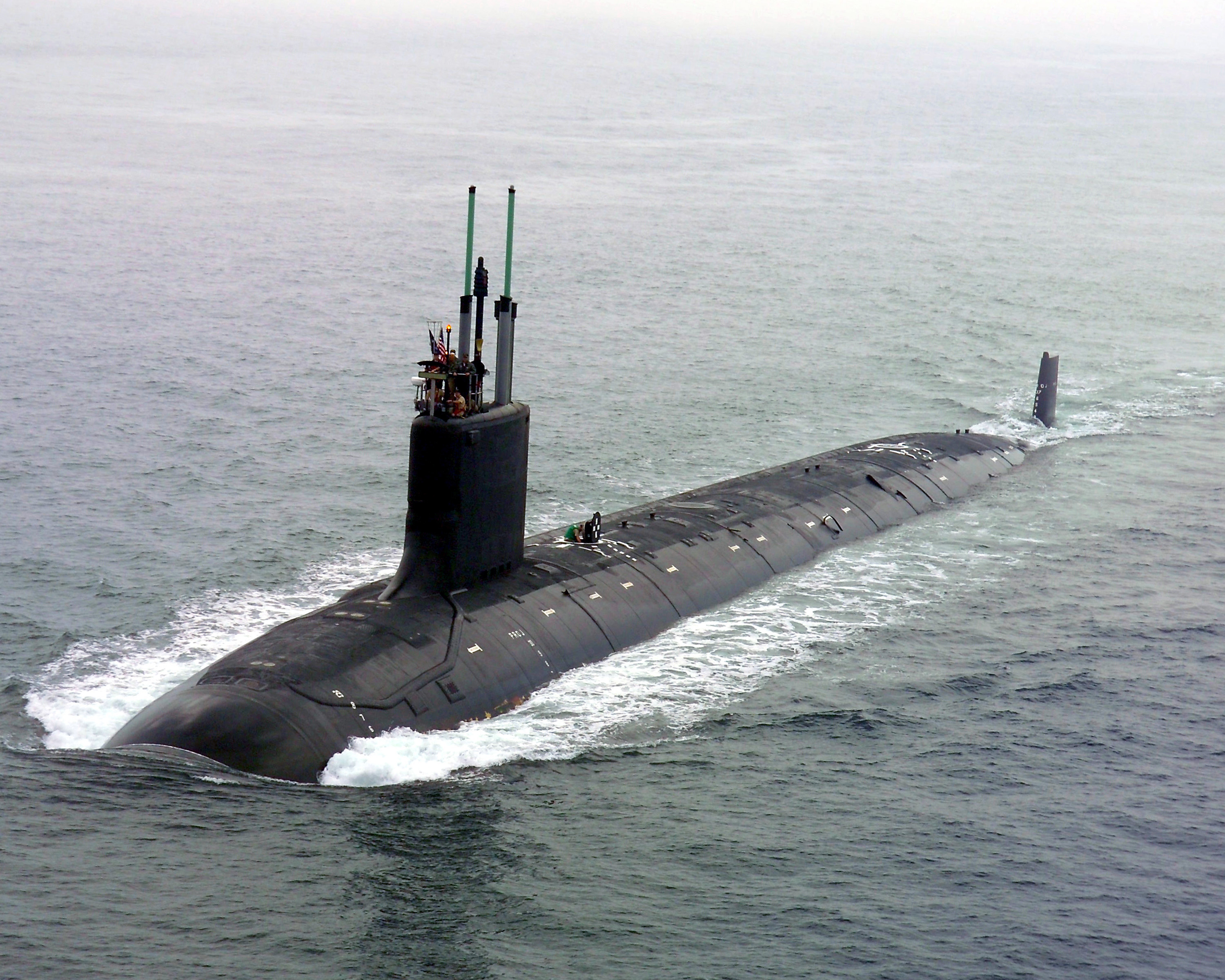
The portion of this submarine hull intended to be walked upon has been covered by non-skid identifiable by darker color.

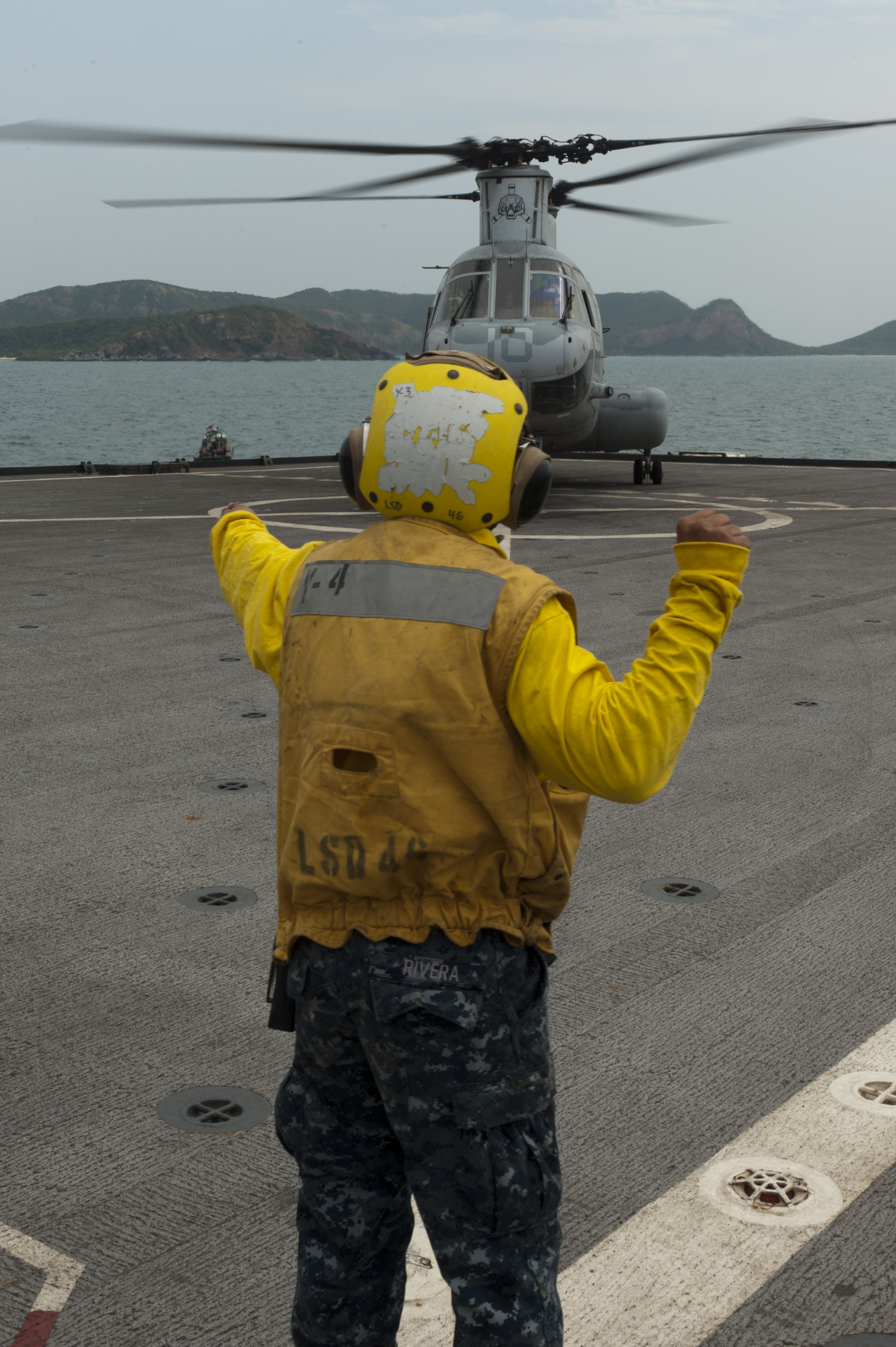
Flight decks are entirely covered by non-skid to prevent aircraft from sliding overboard as the ship rolls.

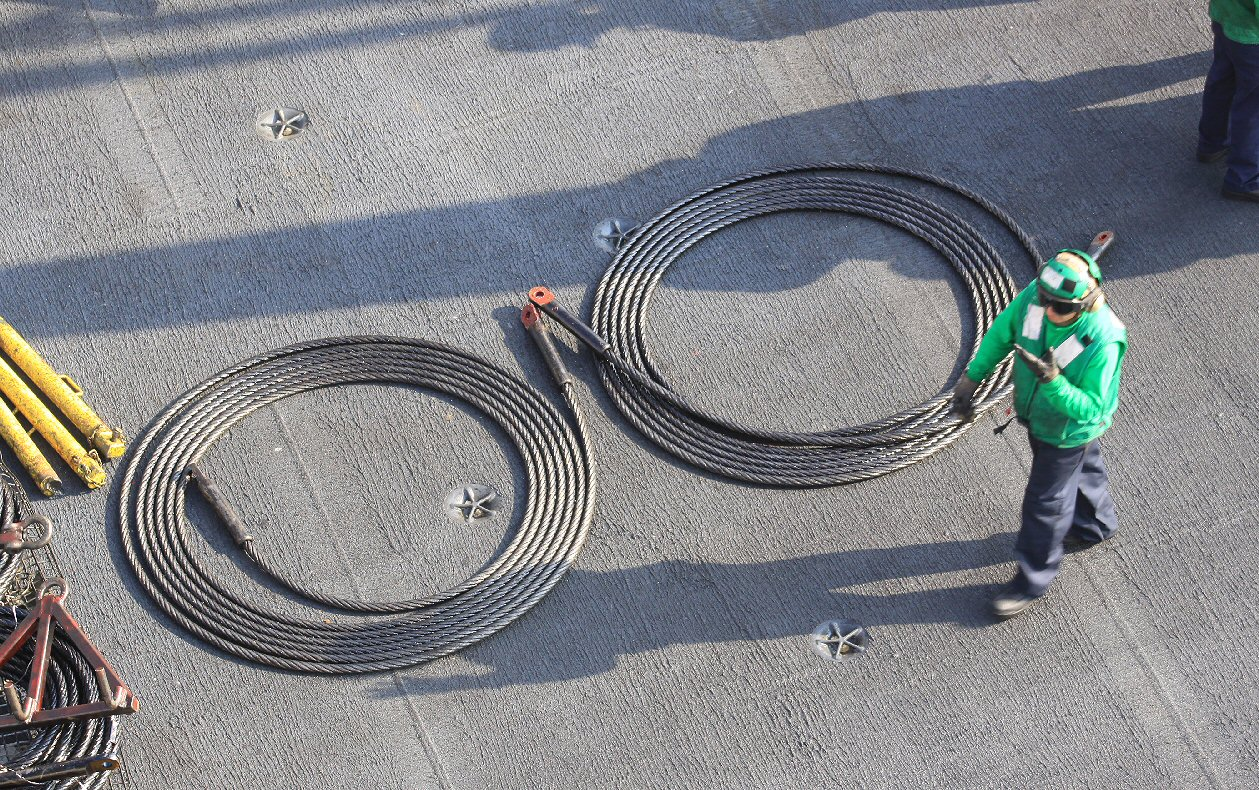
The texture of this flight deck non-skid reveals the application strokes used to spread the mixture of paint and sand.
