= Avilez Rebellion =

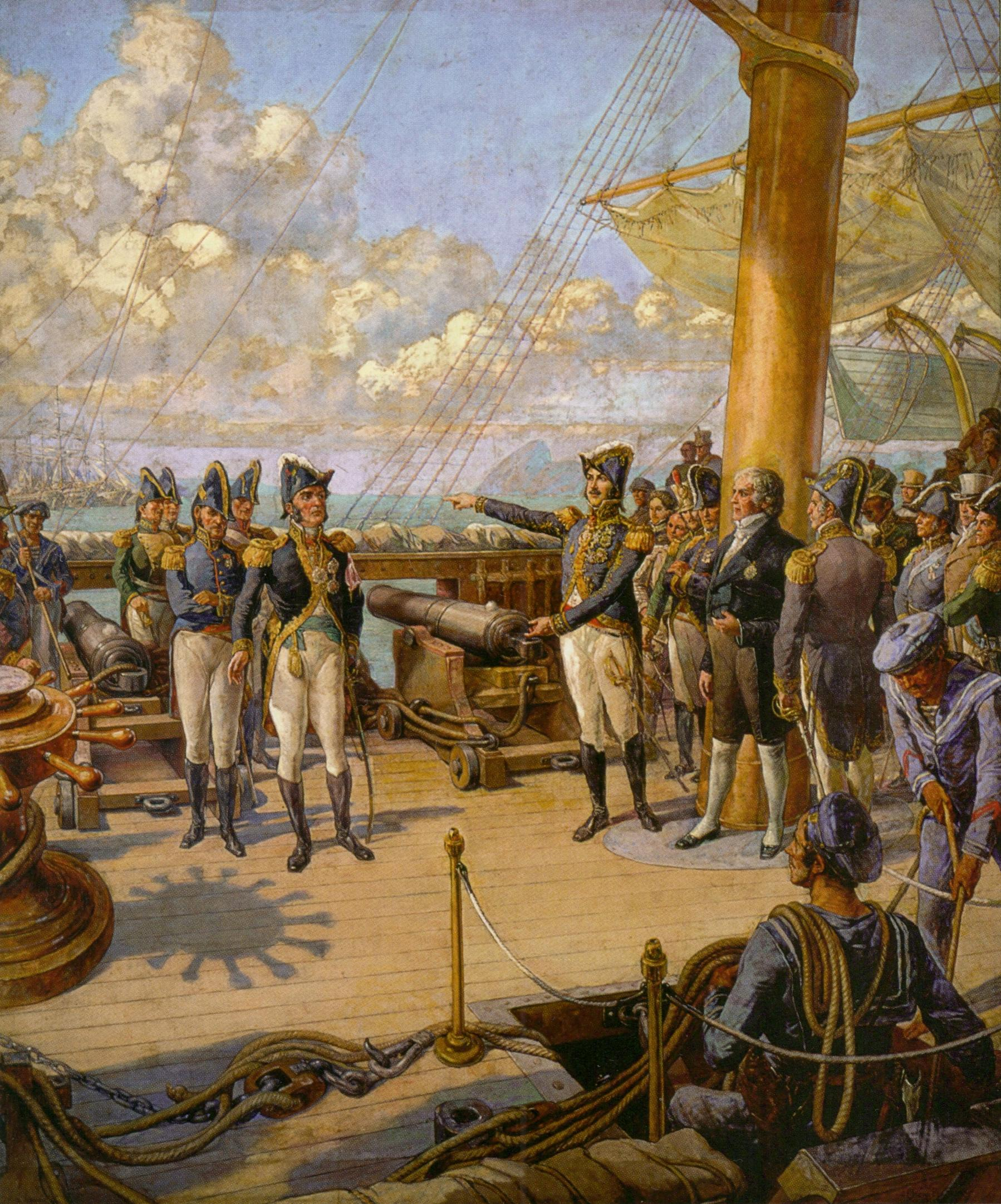
- Prince Pedro (pointing) orders General Avilez (left) to return to Portugal after his failed rebellion, aboard the frigate União, on 8 February 1822
Date	11 January – 15 February 1822
Location	Rio de Janeiro, Brazil
Result	Victory for Prince Regent Pedro

Belligerents
Jorge de Avilez	Prince Regent Pedro; Joaquim X. Curado

Strength
1,700 infantry soldiers	3,000 infantry soldiers 1 cavalry squadron 6 cannons

Casualties and losses
None	None

The Avilez Rebellion was a small uprising that took place during the events that led to the independence of Brazil between the troops of Portuguese General Jorge Avilez and Brazilian troops in response to Prince Pedro's decision to defy the Portuguese Cortes and remain in Brazil.

== Background ==
In 1807, French forces invaded Portugal due to the Portuguese alliance with the United Kingdom. The prince regent of Portugal at the time, João, had formally ruled the country on behalf of his mother Queen Maria I since 1799. Anticipating the invasion of Napoleon's army, Prince João ordered the transfer of the Portuguese royal court to Brazil before he could be deposed. João elevated Brazil to the condition of a kingdom united to Portugal, creating the United Kingdom of Portugal, Brazil and the Algarves. The royal family stayed in Brazil for 13 years, even after the end of the war in Europe.

In 1820, a political revolution broke out in Portugal, the now King João VI left Brazil and returned to the metropolis, arriving in Lisbon on 4 July 1821. Before his departure, the King appointed his heir apparent, Prince Pedro as regent of the Kingdom of Brazil.

The Portuguese Cortes, a kind of constituent assembly, demanded that Brazil return to its former status as a colony and that the prince regent return to Portugal, but Pedro refused.

== The rebellion ==
After Pedro's decision to defy the Cortes and remain in Brazil, the Auxiliary Division, formed by Portuguese troops led by Avillez, mutinied on January 11 and January 12, 1822 in Rio de Janeiro. The men were divided into two groups: one group in Monte Castelo and another group in Largo do Moura, near the port. They wanted to kidnap the Prince Regent and take him by force to Lisbon. In response to the insubordination, militias were formed by local people, priests and friars. On January 12, Prince Pedro send two men to negotiate an end to the mutiny. After the agreement, the troops withdrew to Vila Real da Praia Grande (present-day Niterói). The clashes between the mutineers and loyal troops to Pedro continued until February 10, when the prince ordered the expulsion of the Auxiliary Division from the kingdom. After a quick attempt to take Morro do Castelo, Avillez withdrew to Ponta da Armação, a peninsula in Vila Real da Praia Grande. He tried an attack on the Santa Cruz da Barra Fortress. However, Brazilian forces had established a naval blockade and occupied the Barretos field, while the fortress repelled the attack, surrounding the Portuguese troops who surrendered. Prince Pedro then "dismissed" the Portuguese commanding general and ordered him to remove his soldiers across the bay to Vila Real da Praia Grande, where they would await transport to Portugal.
