= PVC decking =

Decking made of polyvinyl chloride

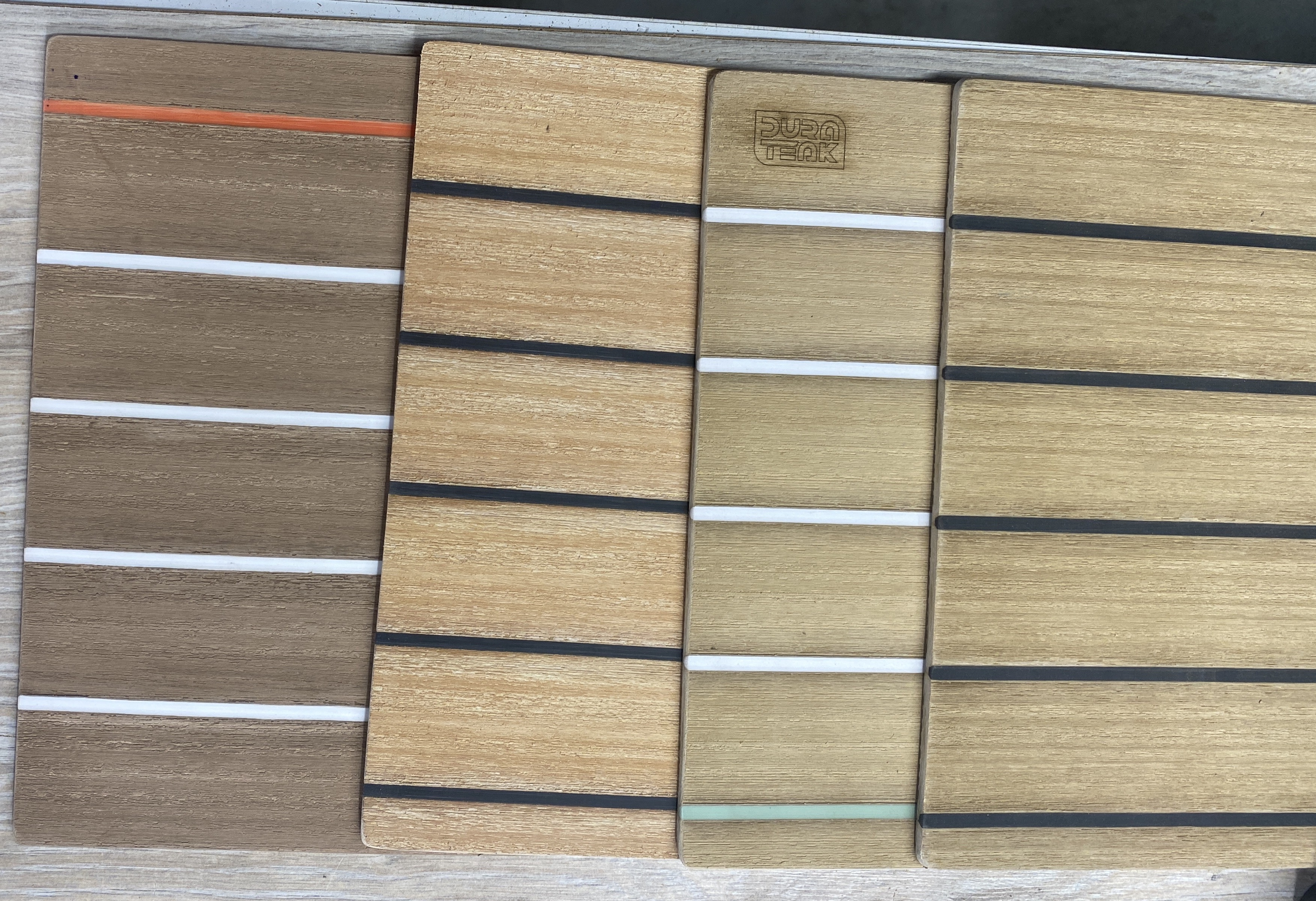
Samples of PVC decking

PVC decking is composed entirely of polyvinyl chloride (PVC) and contains no wood. PVC decking is a more expensive option in the alternative decking industry, but it provides significant fade and stain resistance and lower maintenance requirements compared to other products, including real teak wood.

== History ==
The alternative yacht deck covering was developed by the Dunlop company, known in the automotive industry, in the second half of the 20th century. Its popularity began to rise in the early 2000s due to the relatively high price of wooden decking and the maintenance-free nature of synthetic teak. Moreover, manufacturers have developed increasingly realistic alternatives over the decades, which could be installed more quickly and cheaply, even retrofitted on a yacht deck.

== Production ==
Early manufacturing processes for PVC decking faced high scrap rates, reportedly reaching up to 12%. Advances in technology and recycling have reduced this to below 2% in many factories.Still, commercial production remains complex, with some manufacturers reporting up to one-eighth of boards being cosmetically imperfect and unsellable.

Producing PVC decking is a relatively difficult process called co-extrusion. During production, various stabilizers and colorants are added to the PVC granules, which are melted by the extruder and shaped into teak planks through a specialized mold. In the process, the thermoplastic material is formed at high temperatures and then solidified in a cooling medium. The deck board core is coated and bound with an co-extruded protective cap layer, but the materials can be temperamental and hard to work with. Commercial production is challenging, not only for this reason, but also because about one eighth of the deck boards produced are considered unsellable and therefore scrapped. The fragile nature of this production process requires careful ingredient mixing and precise execution.

The extruded planks need to be manually processed, glued together, caulked, and then adhered to the deck. The high labor requirement makes the process relatively expensive. Due to the desire for realism, it can only be automated to a limited extent. However, this method provides the installer with great flexibility, as these coverings have properties that make them highly shapeable, formable, and bendable.

With the colors of the caulking, a great variety can be achieved. Some manufacturers offer caulking colors that can be selected from the RAL color scale(a standardized European color matching system).

== Advantages ==
PVC decking offers the most significant fade, stain, and mold resistance among decking products. The products are marketed as low-maintenance and are typically easy to clean and maintain. PVC decking typically doesn't require staining, sanding, or painting. It is sometimes partially composed of recycled plastic material, making it an environmentally friendly, efficient use of resources. While PVC decking is lighter than most wood-plastic composite boards, it can still be heavier than natural teak wood due to its dense polymer composition.

Additional benefits:

- recyclable material
- does not absorb red wine and other liquids
- easy to clean
- durable, maintains appearance for 8–10 years

== Disadvantages ==
Compared to other synthetic decking products, PVC is the most expensive. The 100% PVC makeup of the board makes it costlier than the wood powder/plastic mix used in composite decking. This cost means that PVC will be a more expensive investment up front, although manufacturers claim that the long life and low maintenance requirements of the deck make it an economical decision in the long run. PVC lacks the realistic feel of wood. Although manufacturers form the product with a realistic wood grain or brushstroke, some contractors and homeowners simply do not like the artificial sheen of the product. PVC is also formulated to resist scratches, stains, and mold, but some wear will still show over the life of the product.

Additional disadvantages:

- In the heat of summer, the products of certain manufacturers get very hot
- Installation requires expertise
- Heavier than teak wood

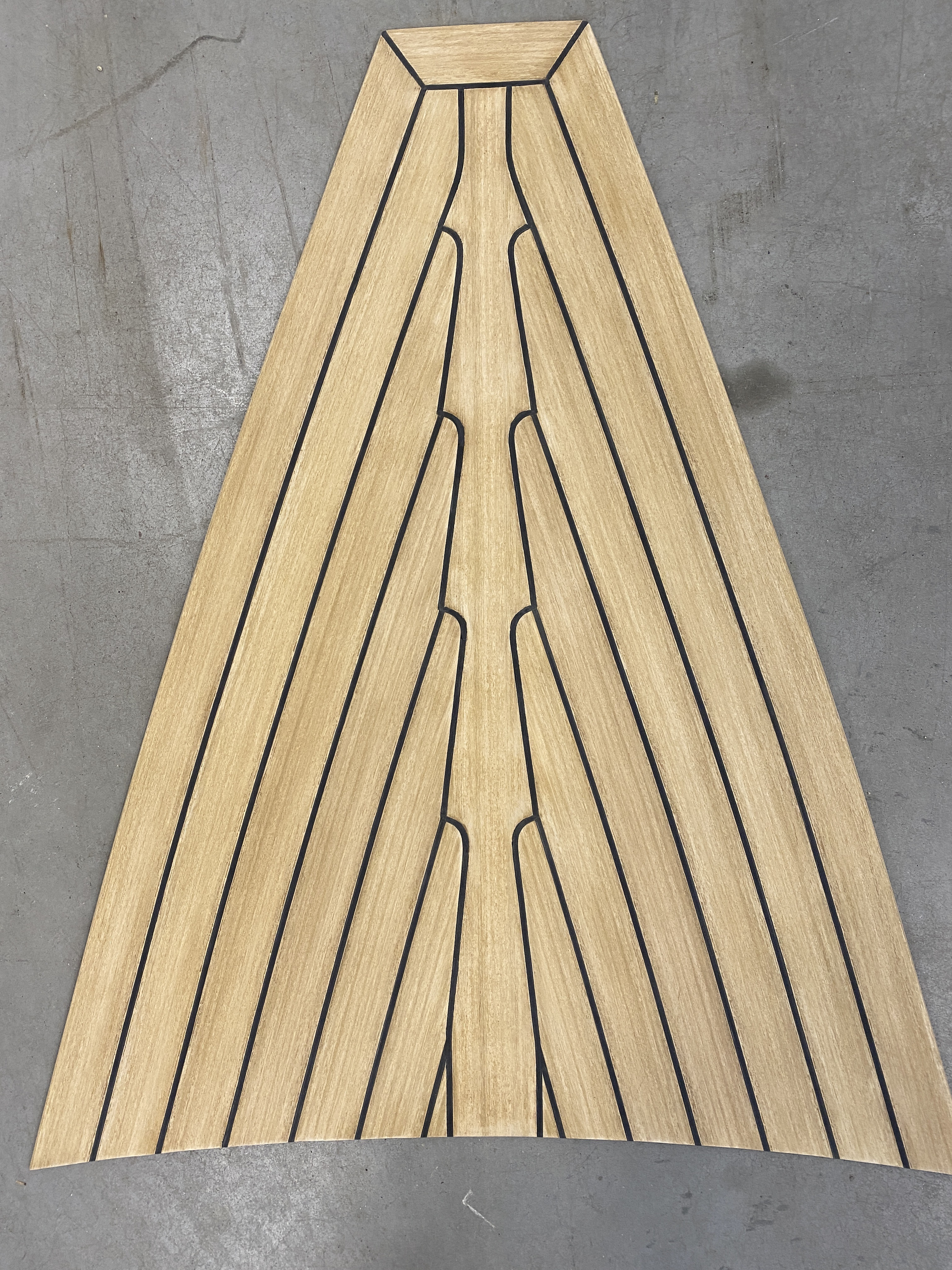

== See also ==
- Composite lumber
- Wood-plastic composite
