= Michael J. Aguilar =

United States Marine Corps general

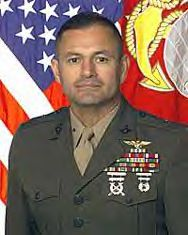

Federal Security Director, San Diego International Airport

Personal details
- Born: May 10, 1950 (age 76) Los Angeles, California, U.S.
- Education: California State University, Long Beach; Naval War College
- Awards: Defense Superior Service Medal, Legion of Merit, Bronze Star Medal, Meritorious Service Medal, Navy and Marine Corps Commendation Medal

Military service
- Branch/service: United States Marine Corps
- Rank: Brigadier general

Michael J. Aguilar (born May 10, 1950) is a retired United States Marine Corps brigadier general and the federal security director of San Diego International Airport. Aguilar is the first Hispanic of Mexican descent to reach the rank of general officer in the United States Marine Corps.

== Early life and education ==
Aguilar, a Mexican-American, was born in Los Angeles, California, the son of Michael Aguilar Sr., and Celia Aguilar. He attended Serra High School, and has an older sister, Sylvia, two younger brothers, Gil and Al, and a niece, Sarah, who teaches United States History.

Aguilar received his bachelor's degree in business administration, California State University, Long Beach and a master's degree in strategic studies and national security affairs, Naval War College.

== Military career ==
Aguilars' last billet was as Deputy Commander, U.S. Marine Corps Forces South, Miami, Florida, and commanding general, Fleet Marine Forces South.

Aguilar has flown H-1 helicopters throughout his career, accumulating nearly 4000 accident free flight hours, and has held a variety of billets in aviation at the squadron, aircraft group and aircraft wing level. He began flying the UH-1E Huey helicopter with Marine Light Helicopter Squadron 267, 3rd Marine Aircraft Wing, Camp Pendleton, and then while assigned to Headquarters and Maintenance Squadron 24, 1st Marine Amphibious Brigade, Kaneohe Bay, Hawaii. He was transferred overseas in 1976 to the 1st Marine Aircraft Wing where he served with Marine Medium Helicopter Squadron 165 aboard Amphibious Naval Ships and Marine Light Helicopter Squadron 367 on Okinawa, Japan.

In 1977 he returned to the 3rd Marine Aircraft Wing and converted to the AH-1J Attack Helicopter serving with Marine Attack Helicopter Squadrons 369 and 169 and the Marine Aircraft Group 39 Staff. He served in the maintenance departments and also as the officer in charge of an AH-1T helicopter detachment deploying with Marine Medium Helicopter Squadron 265 aboard the USS Tarawa. Returning to the 3rd Marine Aircraft Wing in 1982 he was assigned to Marine Light Attack Helicopter Squadron 169 as the operations officer and later as the officer in charge of another AH-1T helicopter detachment deploying with Marine Medium Helicopter Squadron 165 aboard the USS New Orleans.

In 1985, shortly after returning from this deployment, he was transferred to the Marine Recruit Depot, San Diego. He was initially assigned as the executive officer, 2nd Recruit Training Battalion and later as the Director of the Drill Instructor School, the only aviator to hold the billet. In 1988 he was promoted to the rank of lieutenant colonel and was transferred overseas to Okinawa and served on the 1st Marine Aircraft Wing Staff in the Operations Department. In 1989 he returned to the 3rd Marine Aircraft Wing and was assigned to Marine Aircraft Group 50, Camp Pendleton as the operations officer. Shortly after Iraq invaded Kuwait, he was assigned to Marine Aircraft Group 70 and deployed to Southwest Asia in August 1990.

During the Gulf War he served as the executive officer, Marine Aircraft Group 16 operating out of Al Jubayl, Saudi Arabia, and later up north near Kuwait. After the war he returned to the 3rd Marine Aircraft Wing and assumed command of Marine Light Attack Helicopter Squadron 267 and later served as the Marine Aircraft Group 39 Executive Officer. In August 1993 he attended the Naval War College and was promoted to colonel in October of that same year. In July 1994 he returned to Marine Aircraft Group 39 serving first as executive officer and then as commanding officer. In August 1997 he was transferred to the Office of the Secretary of Defense serving as the senior military assistant to the Under Secretary of Defense for Policy and, after promotion to brigadier general, to the Joint Staff as the deputy director for operations, National Military Command Center. In July 1999 he was assigned as the commanding general, Joint Task Force Panama, where he oversaw force protection during the drawdown of forces and transfer of property and equipment to the government of Panama. In December 1999 he transferred to Marine Forces South, Miami, Florida.

== Military promotions ==
Rank	Date
Brigadier general	1998
Colonel	1993
Lieutenant colonel	1988
Major	1981
Naval Aviator	1972
Second lieutenant	1971

== Decorations and honors ==
Brigadier General Aguilar's personal decorations include the Defense Superior Service Medal with Oak Leaf in lieu of a second award, Legion of Merit, Bronze Star, Meritorious Service Medal and the Navy and Marine Corps Commendation Medal.

== Airport security director ==
In March 2002, Aguilar joined the TSA as federal security director for San Diego International Airport. In 2007, he was honored as the Federal Security Director of the Year for the Western Region.

== See also ==
- http://www.popehat.com/2010/11/16/its-such-a-fine-line-between-stupid-and-clever/
- http://www.thecrimereport.org/archive/criminal-probe-into-case-of-ca-man-who-refused-airport-scan/
- Hispanics in the United States Marine Corps
- https://web.archive.org/web/20111004071528/http://senweb03.senate.ca.gov/committee/standing/GOVERNANCE/10-10-06FINALREPORT.pdf
