= Edward Gómez =

US Marine Corps Medal of Honor recipient (1932–1951)

Edward Gomez
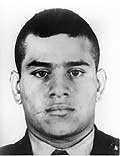
- Gómez in c. 1951
- Born: August 10, 1932; Omaha, Nebraska, United States
- Died: September 14, 1951 (aged 19); Punchbowl, Korea
- Burial place: Saint Mary's Cemetery, Omaha, Nebraska
- Military career
- Allegiance: United States
- Branch: United States Marine Corps
- Service years: 1949–1951
- Rank: Private First Class
- Units: Company E, 2nd Battalion, 1st Marines, 1st Marine Division
- Conflicts: Korean War: Battle of the Punchbowl †
- Awards: Medal of Honor; Purple Heart (2)

Edward Gómez (August 10, 1932 – September 14, 1951) was a United States Marine from Omaha, Nebraska, who posthumously received the Medal of Honor — the United States' highest decoration for valor — for sacrificing his life to save the lives of four fellow Marines on his machine gun team during the Battle of the Punchbowl. Gomez was the 18th Marine to receive the Medal of Honor for heroism during the Korean War.

== Early years ==
Gomez, a Mexican-American, attended Omaha High School before enlisting in the United States Marine Corps Reserve on August 11, 1949, at the age of 17. After recruit training at Marine Corps Recruit Depot San Diego, California, he trained at Camp Pendleton, California, and went to Korea with the 7th Replacement Draft.

== Medal of Honor citation ==
PFC Gomez's citation reads.

"The President of the United States in the name of The Congress takes pride in presenting the MEDAL OF HONOR posthumously to

PRIVATE FIRST CLASS EDWARD GOMEZ
UNITED STATES MARINE CORPS RESERVE

for service as set forth in the following CITATION:

For conspicuous gallantry and intrepidity at the risk of his life above and beyond the call of duty while serving as an Ammunition Bearer in Company E, Second Battalion, First Marines, First Marine Division (Reinforced), in action against enemy aggressor forces in Korea on September 14, 1951. Boldly advancing with his squad in support of a group of riflemen assaulting a series of strongly fortified and bitterly defended hostile positions on Hill 749, Private First Class Gómez consistently exposed himself to the withering barrage to keep his machine gun supplied with ammunition during the drive forward to seize the objective. As his squad deployed to meet an imminent counterattack, he voluntarily moved down an abandoned trench to search for a new location for the gun and, when a hostile grenade landed between himself and his weapon, shouted a warning to those around him as he grasped the activated charge in his hand. Determined to save his comrades, he unhesitatingly chose to sacrifice himself and, diving into the ditch with the deadly missile, absorbed the shattering violence of the explosion in his own body. By his stouthearted courage, incomparable valor and decisive spirit of self-sacrifice, Private First Class Gómez inspired the others to heroic efforts in subsequently repelling the outnumbering foe, and his valiant conduct throughout sustained and enhanced the finest traditions of the United States Naval Service. He gallantly gave his life for his country.

HARRY S. TRUMAN"

== Awards and decorations ==
The United States' highest decoration for valor was awarded to Gomez for extraordinary heroism on September 14, 1951, at Kajon-ni, during the Battle of the Punchbowl when he smothered a hand grenade with his own body to prevent destruction of his Marine machine gun team. In addition to the Medal of Honor, PFC Gomez was awarded the Purple Heart with a Gold Star in lieu of a second award, the Korean Service Medal with bronze star, and the United Nations Service Medal.

1st row	Medal of Honor		Purple Heart With 5/16 inch star
2nd row	Combat Action Ribbon Retroactively Awarded, 1999	National Defense Service Medal	Korean Service Medal with 2 Campaign stars
3rd row	Korean Presidential Unit Citation	United Nations Service Medal Korea	Korean War Service Medal Retroactively Awarded, 2003

== Recognitions ==
Ed "Babe" Gomez Elementary School was named in his honor. It is located at 5101 S 17th St, Omaha, NE 68107. He also has an Avenue named after him on which several businesses are located and Metropolitan Community College South Campus.

== See also ==
- List of Korean War Medal of Honor recipients
- List of Hispanic Medal of Honor recipients
- Hispanics in the United States Marine Corps
