= USS Tripoli =

USS Tripoli may refer to:

- USS Tripoli (CVE-64) was a Casablanca-class escort carrier in service from 1943 to 1958
- USS Tripoli (LPH-10) was an Iwo Jima-class amphibious assault ship in service from 1966 to 1995
- USS Tripoli (LHA-7) is an America-class amphibious assault ship commissioned in 2020
