= Landing helicopter assault =

Amphibious assault ship that can carry helicopters

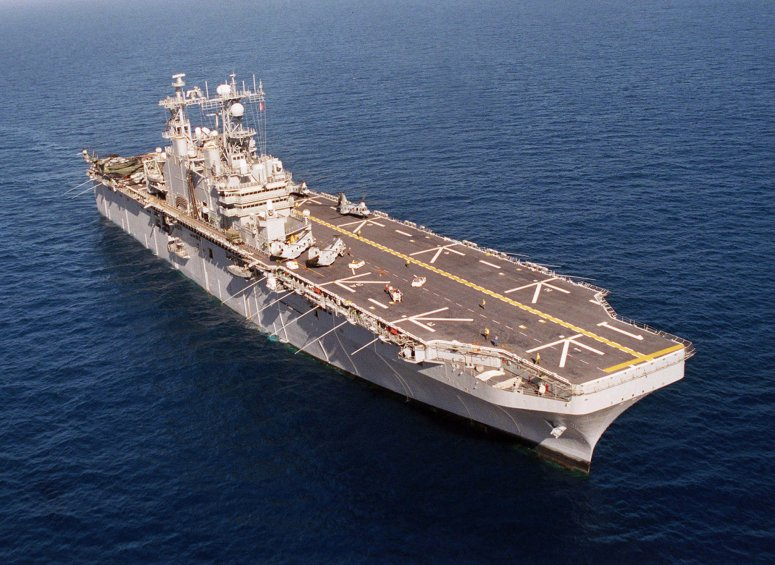
USS Tarawa (LHA-1) underway in June 1997

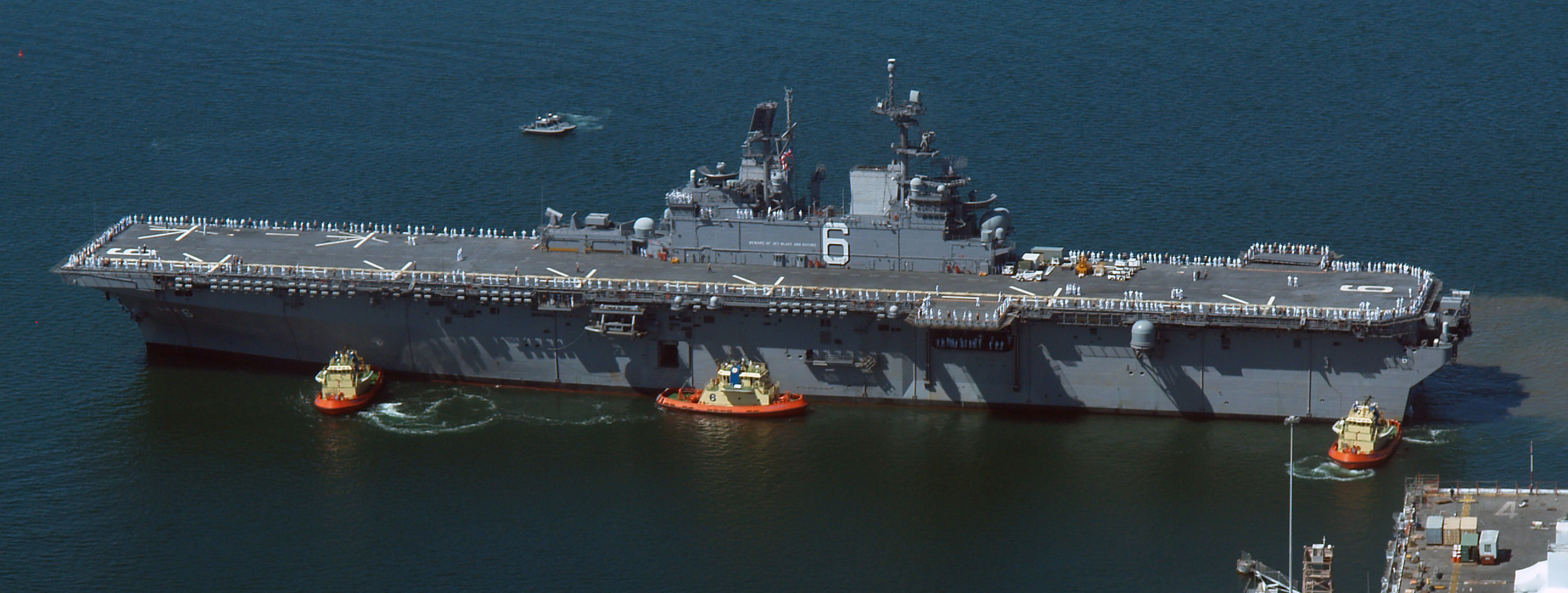
An aerial view of USS America (LHA-6) coming into port in San Diego, California, 15 September 2014

Landing helicopter assault (LHA) is the United States Navy's hull classification symbol for the general-purpose helicopter-carrying amphibious assault ships of the Tarawa and America classes.

Their purpose is to project power and maintain presence by serving as the cornerstone of the amphibious ready group or expeditionary strike group. They are used to transport Fleet Marine Force personnel and equipment while operating in a deployed marine expeditionary unit (MEU) or marine expeditionary brigade (MEB). They normally travel in task forces called "amphibious ready groups". These ships and their escorts are capable of anything from military landing operations to humanitarian operations.

These vessels are built with a full flight deck similar in appearance to an aircraft carrier to operate utility and attack helicopters. They can also operate tilt rotor aircraft such as the MV-22 Osprey and STOVL aircraft such as the AV-8 Harrier and the F-35B Lightning II.

The Tarawa-class LHAs provided the Marine Corps with a means of ship-to-shore movement by helicopter in addition to movement by landing craft. They were the first ships designed to do both things efficiently at the same time.

The first two ships of the new America class, LHA-6 and LHA-7, differ from both the older Tarawa-class LHAs and LHDs in that they have no well deck; LHA-8 and following ships include well deck facilities. LHAs that contain a well deck are able to support the use of landing craft, air cushions (LCACs) and other watercraft.

Three Tarawa Class LHAs were active during Operations Desert Shield and Desert Storm. Since then, LHAs have participated in US Navy operations as launch platforms for Marine Corps expeditionary forces into Afghanistan during Operation Enduring Freedom (2001/02), Iraq in Operation Iraqi Freedom (2003) and humanitarian support after the tsunami in 2004. In 2004, LHAs were used to transport marines and their equipment to Iraq and Afghanistan for combat operations.

| Hull number | Name | Commissioned | Decommissioned |
|---|---|---|---|
Tarawa-class amphibious assault ships
| LHA-1 | USS Tarawa | May 29, 1976 | September 30, 2009 |
| LHA-2 | USS Saipan | October 15, 1977 | April 20, 2007 |
| LHA-3 | USS Belleau Wood | September 23, 1978 | October 28, 2005 |
| LHA-4 | USS Nassau | July 28, 1979 | March 31, 2011 |
| LHA-5 | USS Peleliu | May 3, 1980 | April 7, 2015 |
America-class amphibious assault ships
| LHA-6 | USS America | October 11, 2014 | The America-class warships will replace the original five Tarawa-class LHAs. |
| LHA-7 | USS Tripoli | February 28, 2020 | |
| LHA-8 | USS Bougainville | Under construction | |
| LHA-9 | USS Fallujah | Under construction | |

== See also ==
- Amphibious assault ship
- Helicopter carrier
- List of amphibious warfare ships
- List of United States Navy amphibious warfare ships § Amphibious Assault Ship (General Purpose) (LHA)
