= USS Helmand Province =

US Navy vessel

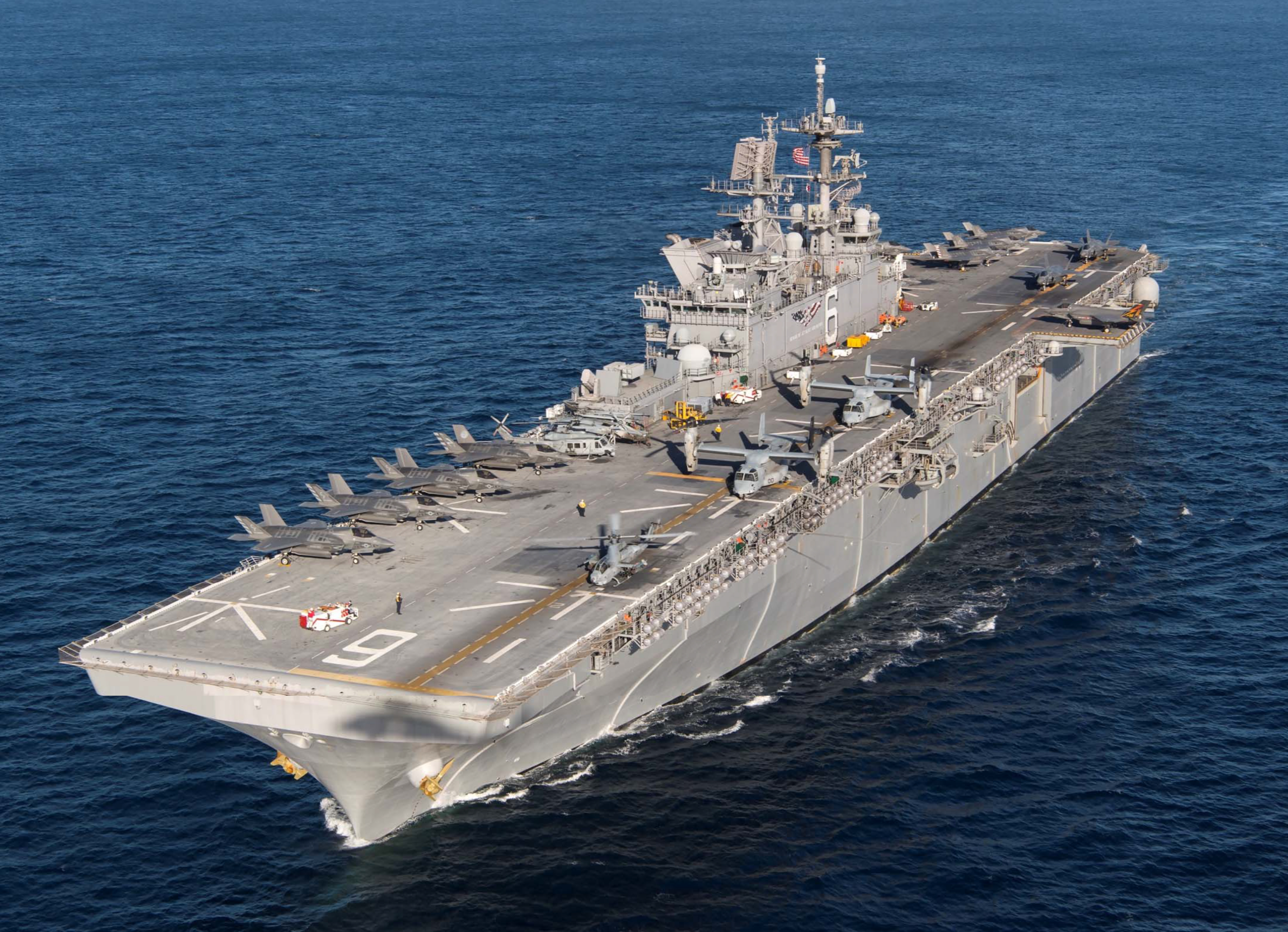
- Lead of the class USS America

History

United States
- Name: Helmand Province
- Namesake: Helmand province campaign
- Builder: Huntington Ingalls Industries
- Identification: Hull number: LHA-10
- Badge

General characteristics
- Class & type: America-class amphibious assault ship
- Displacement: 44,971 long tons (45,693 t)
- Length: 844 ft (257 m)
- Beam: 106 ft (32 m)
- Draft: 26 ft (7.9 m) (7.9 meters)
- Propulsion: Two marine gas turbines, two shafts, 70,000 bhp (52,000 kW), two 5,000 hp (3,700 kW) auxiliary propulsion motors.
- Speed: Over 22 knots (41 km/h; 25 mph)
- Boats & landing craft carried: 4 Landing Craft Air Cushion or; 1 Landing Craft Utility
- Complement: 65 officers, 994 enlisted; 1,687 Marines (plus 184 surge)
- Sensors & processing systems: AN/SPQ-9B fire control; AN/SPY-6(V)2 EASR airsearch radar
- Electronic warfare & decoys: AN/SLQ-32B(V)2; 2× Mk53 Nulka decoy launchers
- Armament: 2× Rolling Airframe Missile launchers; 2× Evolved Sea Sparrow Missile launchers; 2× 20mm Phalanx CIWS mounts; 7× twin .50 BMG 12.7mm machine guns
- Aircraft carried: MV-22B Osprey; F-35B Lightning II; CH-53K King Stallion; UH-1Y Venom; AH-1Z Viper; MH-60S Knighthawk

USS Helmand Province (LHA-10) will be the fifth America-class amphibious assault ship of the United States Navy. The ship is named after the Afghan Helmand Province, the site of a US Marine Corps campaign during the War in Afghanistan.

== Design ==
The design of Helmand Province is based on USS Makin Island, which is an improved version of the Wasp-class amphibious assault ship. While Makin Island has a well deck, the earlier two Flight 0 America-class ships USS America and USS Tripoli were designed and built without a well deck to make space for aircraft and aviation fuel.

She will be the third Flight I America-class ship, and as such will include a well deck. The design of the Flight I America-class ships, including that of Helmand Province, adopts a compromise, incorporating a slightly smaller aircraft hangar as well as smaller medical and other spaces to fit a small well deck for surface connector operations. The island structure will also be modified to free up more room on the flight deck to accommodate maintenance of V-22s, compensating for some of the lost aircraft hangar space.

== History ==
The then-LHA-10 was authorized by the United States Congress in 2023, providing $US 1.38 billion for her procurement.

The ship was named by Secretary of the Navy Carlos Del Toro on 2 May 2024, intending to honor the US sailors and marines who fought in the strategic Helmand Province Campaign during the War in Afghanistan.
