= USS Bougainville =

USS Bougainville may refer to:

- USS Bougainville (CVE-100) was a Casablanca-class escort carrier in service from 1944 to 1946
- USS Bougainville (LHA-8) is a planned America-class amphibious assault ship expected to deliver in 2024
