= USS Bougainville (LHA-8) =

America-class amphibious assault ship

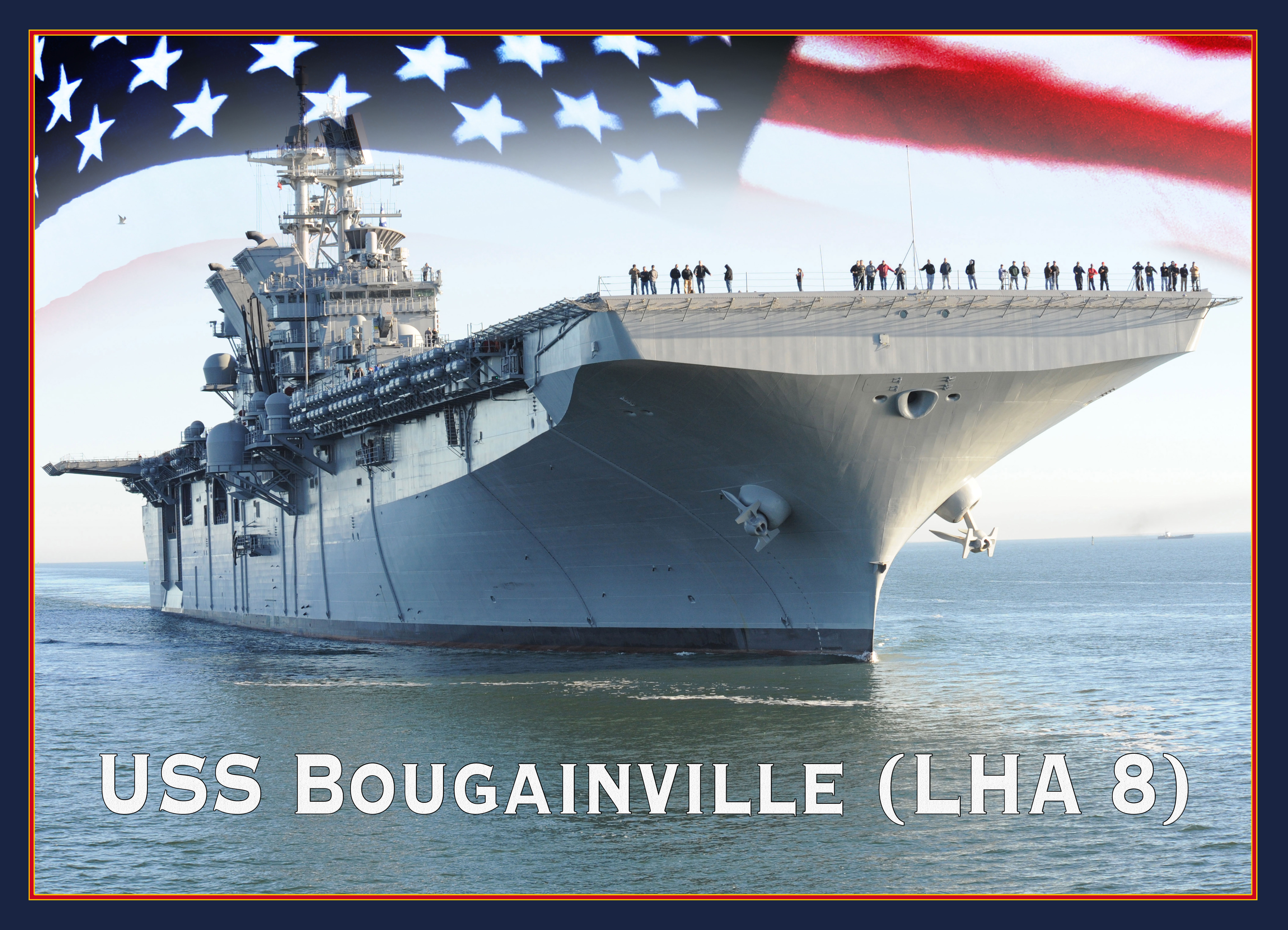
- Graphical depiction of USS Bougainville (LHA-8)

History

United States
- Name: Bougainville
- Namesake: Bougainville Campaign
- Awarded: 30 June 2016
- Builder: Huntington Ingalls Industries
- Laid down: 14 March 2019
- Launched: 30 September 2023
- Christened: 2 December 2023
- Identification: Hull number: LHA-8
- Motto: Loyal, Fierce, Brave
- Status: Under construction
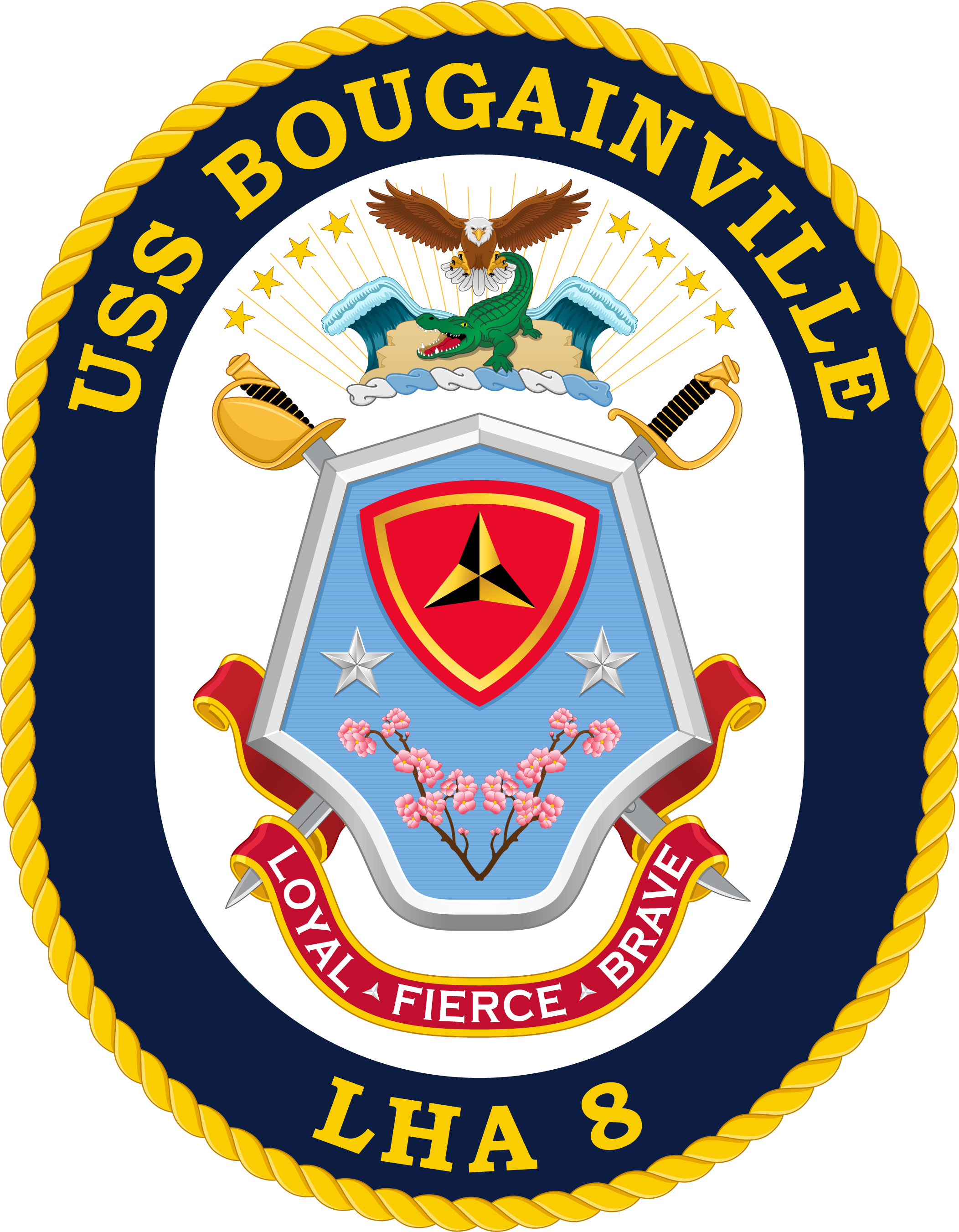
- Badge

General characteristics
- Class & type: America-class amphibious assault ship
- Displacement: 44,971 long tons (45,693 t)
- Length: 844 ft (257 m)
- Beam: 106 ft (32 m)
- Draft: 26 ft (7.9 m) (7.9 meters)
- Propulsion: Two marine gas turbines, two shafts, 70,000 bhp (52,000 kW), two 5,000 hp (3,700 kW) auxiliary propulsion motors.
- Speed: Over 22 knots (41 km/h; 25 mph)
- Boats & landing craft carried: 4 Landing Craft Air Cushion or; 1 Landing Craft Utility
- Complement: 65 officers, 994 enlisted; 1,687 Marines (plus 184 surge)
- Sensors & processing systems: AN/SPQ-9B fire control; AN/SPY-6(V)2 EASR airsearch radar
- Electronic warfare & decoys: AN/SLQ-32B(V)2; 2 × Mk53 Nulka decoy launchers
- Armament: 2× Rolling Airframe Missile launchers; 2× Evolved Sea Sparrow Missile launchers; 2× 20 mm Phalanx CIWS mounts; 7× twin .50 BMG machine guns
- Aircraft carried: AV-8B Harrier II; MV-22B Osprey; F-35B Lightning II; CH-53K King Stallion; UH-1Y Venom; AH-1Z Viper; MH-60S Knighthawk

USS Bougainville (LHA-8) is an America-class amphibious assault ship currently under construction for the United States Navy. She will be the second Navy ship to be named Bougainville.

== Design ==
The design of Bougainville is based on USS Makin Island, which is an improved version of the Wasp-class amphibious assault ship. While Makin Island has a well deck, the earlier two Flight 0 America-class ships USS America and USS Tripoli were designed and built without a well deck to make space for aircraft and aviation fuel. Bougainville will be the first Flight I America-class ship, and as such will include a well deck. The design of the Flight I America-class ships, including that of Bougainville, adopts a compromise, incorporating a slightly smaller aircraft hangar as well as smaller medical and other spaces to fit a small well deck for surface connector operations. The island structure will also be modified to free up more room on the flight deck to accommodate maintenance of V-22s, compensating for some of the lost aircraft hangar space.

Bougainville will be the first of her class built with a redesigned and stronger main deck; the earlier America-class vessels America and Tripoli each required retrofitting in order to handle the strain of daily F-35B Lightning II flight operations. In addition, Bougainville will incorporate the AN/SPY-6 Enterprise Air Surveillance Radar (EASR) volume air search radar in lieu of the AN/SPS-48G air search radar in America and Tripoli. The Gerald R. Ford-class aircraft carriers starting with John F. Kennedy and the planned LX(R)-class amphibious warfare ships will also have this radar.

== Construction and career ==
Bougainville is being built by Huntington Ingalls Industries at their shipyard in Pascagoula, Mississippi and is expected to be delivered to the U.S. Navy in July 2027, delayed from the original timeline of October 2024.

Bougainville officially started fabrication on 16 October 2018. The ship was first laid down on 14 March 2019.

On 30 June 2023 a fire in the ship's superstructure was reported, there were six minor injuries, and reportedly minimal damage to the ship. The fire is being investigated by the Navy and Ingalls Shipbuilding.

The Bougainville was christened on Saturday, December 2, 2023, by the ship's sponsor Ellyn Dunford, wife of United States Marine Corps General Joseph Dunford.
