= USS Fallujah =

America-class amphibious assault ship

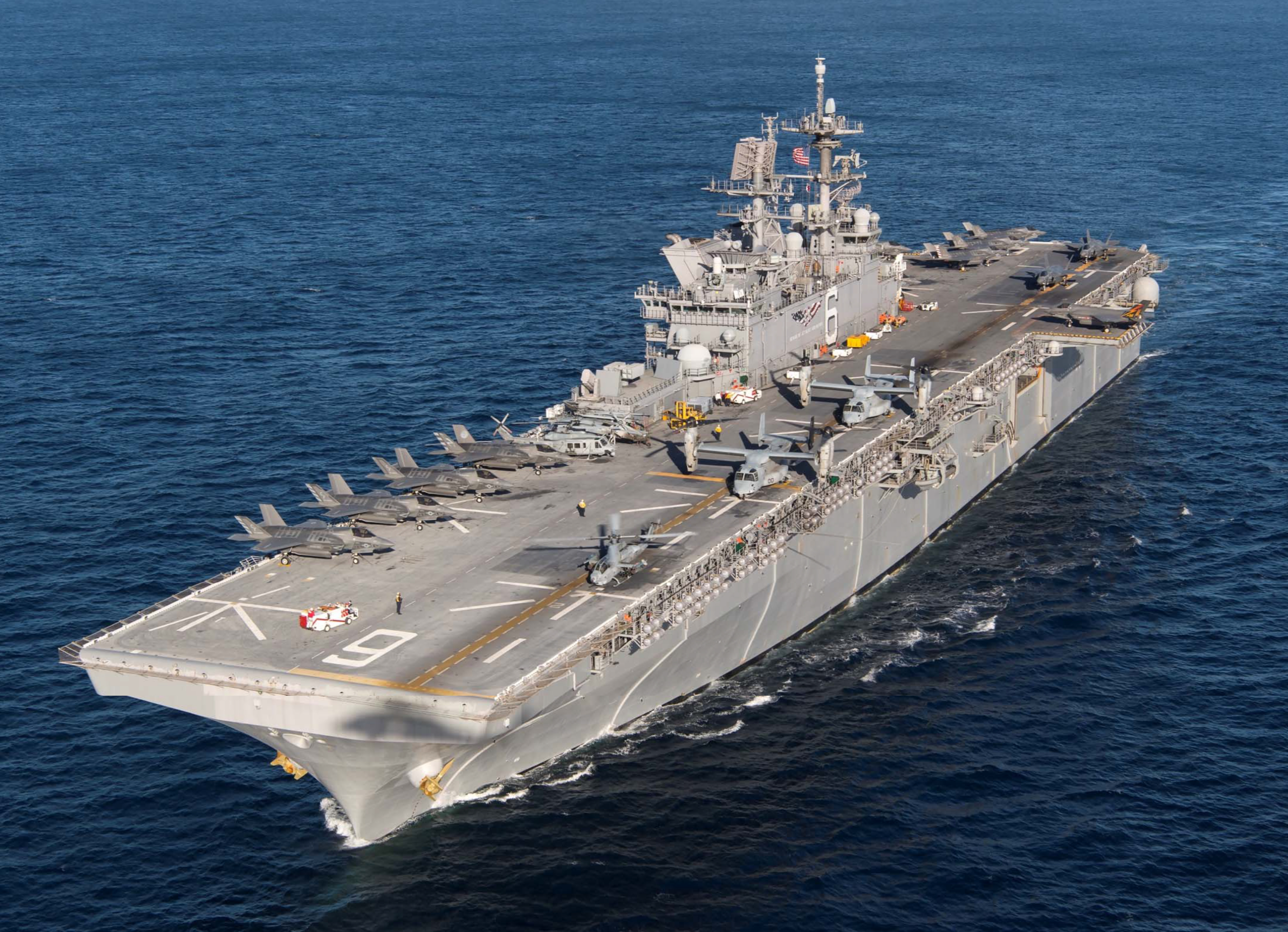
- Sister ship USS America

History

United States
- Name: Fallujah
- Namesake: The first and second battle of Fallujah
- Awarded: 27 October 2022
- Builder: Huntington Ingalls Industries
- Laid down: 20 September 2023
- Sponsored by: Donna Berger
- Identification: Hull number: LHA-9

General characteristics
- Class & type: America-class amphibious assault ship
- Displacement: 44,971 long tons (45,693 t)
- Length: 844 ft (257 m)
- Beam: 106 ft (32 m)
- Draft: 26 ft (7.9 m) (7.9 meters)
- Propulsion: Two marine gas turbines, two shafts, 70,000 bhp (52,000 kW), two 5,000 hp (3,700 kW) auxiliary propulsion motors.
- Speed: Over 22 knots (41 km/h; 25 mph)
- Boats & landing craft carried: 4 Landing Craft Air Cushion or; 1 Landing Craft Utility
- Complement: 65 officers, 994 enlisted; 1,687 Marines (plus 184 surge)
- Sensors & processing systems: AN/SPQ-9B fire control; AN/SPY-6(V)2 EASR airsearch radar
- Electronic warfare & decoys: AN/SLQ-32B(V)2; 2× Mk53 Nulka decoy launchers
- Armament: 2× Rolling Airframe Missile launchers; 2× Evolved Sea Sparrow Missile launchers; 2× 20mm Phalanx CIWS mounts; 7× twin .50 BMG 12.7mm machine guns
- Aircraft carried: MV-22B Osprey; F-35B Lightning II; CH-53K King Stallion; UH-1Y Venom; AH-1Z Viper; MH-60S Knighthawk

USS Fallujah (LHA-9) will be an America-class amphibious assault ship of the United States Navy and the first ship to bear this name to commemorate the first and second battles at Fallujah during the Iraq War in 2004. On 13 December 2022, Secretary of the Navy Carlos Del Toro announced the name in a press release.

== Design ==
The design of Fallujah is based on USS Makin Island, which is an improved version of the Wasp-class amphibious assault ship. While Makin Island has a well deck, the earlier two Flight 0 America-class ships USS America and USS Tripoli were designed and built without a well deck to make space for aircraft and aviation fuel.

Fallujah will be the second Flight I America-class ship, and as such will include a well deck. The design of the Flight I America-class ships, including that of Fallujah, adopts a compromise, incorporating a slightly smaller aircraft hangar as well as smaller medical and other spaces to fit a small well deck for surface connector operations. The island structure will also be modified to free up more room on the flight deck to accommodate maintenance of V-22s, compensating for some of the lost aircraft hangar space.

== History ==
=== Construction and career ===
Fallujah is currently being built at Ingalls Shipbuilding in Pascagoula, Mississippi by Huntington Ingalls Industries and began fabrication on 19 December 2022.

=== Naming ===
The ship's namesake comes from the first and second battle of Fallujah, which were notable for polarizing public opinion within Iraq.

When announcing the name, Navy Secretary Carlo Del Toro said: "The name selection follows the tradition of naming amphibious ships after the U.S. Marine Corps battles, early U.S. sailing ships or legacy names of earlier carriers from World War II. It is an honor for me for our nation to memorialize the Marines, the soldiers and coalition forces that fought valiantly and those who sacrificed their lives during both battles of Fallujah".

The commandant of the US Marine Corps, Gen. David Berger, cited the battles of Fallujah as an American triumph. "Under extraordinary odds, the Marines prevailed against a determined enemy who enjoyed all the advantages of defending in an urban area. The Battle of Fallujah is, and will remain, imprinted in the minds of all Marines and serves as a reminder to our Nation, and its foes, why our Marines call themselves the world’s finest."

Journalist Peter Maass criticized the choice of naming, saying, "The announcement noted that more than 100 U.S. and allied soldiers died in Fallujah but said nothing about the far larger toll of Iraqi civilians killed, the flattening of swathes of the city through extensive bombings, the apparent war crimes by U.S. forces, the environmental impact and the health impacts on civilians that continue to this day — and the inconvenient fact that U.S. forces were unable to keep their hold on Fallujah for very long."

Some notable Iraqis have also protested the naming choice; "The pain of defeat in Fallujah is haunting the U.S. military," wrote Ahmed Mansour, an Al Jazeera journalist who reported from Fallujah during the fiercest fighting. "They want to turn the war crimes they committed there into a victory, while opponents committed no such war crimes" Iraqi human rights activist Muntader al-Zaidi said, "It is insulting to consider the killing of innocent people as a victory [...] Do you want to boast about forces that kill and hunt innocent people? I hope this ship will always remind you of the shame of the invasion and the humiliation of the occupation." The first battle of Fallujah resulted in an American withdrawal, whereas the second was a Coalition victory, as the city was captured and American objectives were achieved by the end of 2004.

The Council on American-Islamic Relations issued a statement, "There must be a better name for this ship — one that does not evoke horrific scenes from any illegal, violent and unjust war."
