= Tarawa-class amphibious assault ship =

Class of US amphibious assault ships

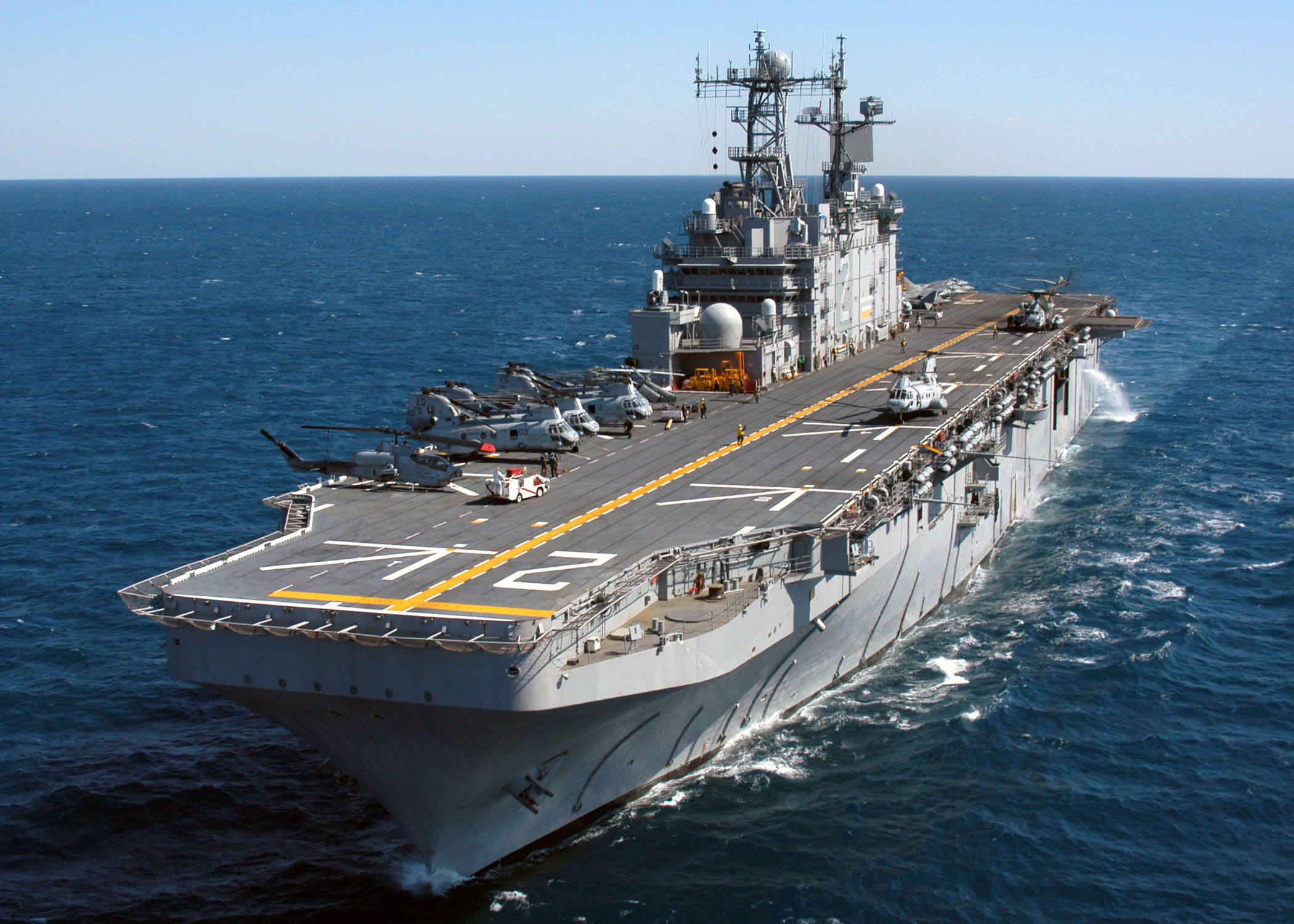
- USS Saipan during Expeditionary Strike Group integration training in 2004

Class overview
- Name: Tarawa class
- Builders: Ingalls Shipbuilding
- Operators: United States Navy
- Preceded by: Iwo Jima class
- Succeeded by: Wasp class
- Built: 15 November 1971 – 3 May 1980
- In commission: 29 May 1976 – 31 March 2015
- Planned: 9
- Completed: 5
- Canceled: 4
- Retired: 5

General characteristics
- Class & type: Amphibious assault ship/LHA
- Displacement: 39,967 tonnes (39,336 long tons; 44,056 short tons) full load
- Length: 834 feet (254 m)
- Beam: 131.9 feet (40.2 m)
- Draft: 25.9 feet (7.9 m)
- Propulsion: 2 × Combustion Engineering boilers; 2 × Westinghouse turbines; 70,000 horsepower (52,000 kW); 2 × propeller shafts; 1 × bow thruster
- Speed: 24 knots (44 km/h; 28 mph)
- Range: 10,000 nautical miles (19,000 km; 12,000 mi) at 20 knots (37 km/h; 23 mph)
- Boats & landing craft carried: 4 × LCU 1610; Or two LCU and two LCM-8; Or 17 LCM-6; Or 45 AAVP
- Troops: 1,703
- Complement: 56 officers, 874 sailors (1998)
- Armament: As of 1998: Mark 49 RAM missile system; 2 × Vulcan Phalanx; 6 × 25 mm automatic cannons; 8 × 12.7 mm machine guns; Previous weapons: 2 × 8 cell MK- 25 NATO Sea Sparrow BPDMS launchers (replaced by Phalanx units); 3 × 5-inch (127 mm) Mk 45 lightweight guns (removed 1997–1998)
- Aircraft carried: Up to 19 Sea Stallions, 26 Sea Knights, or mixed airgroup; 6 Harrier jump-jets
- Aviation facilities: 820-by-118.1-foot (249.9 by 36.0 m) flight deck with 2 aircraft lifts

The Tarawa class was a ship class of Landing Helicopter Assault (LHA) type amphibious assault ships operated by the United States Navy (USN). Five ships were built by Ingalls Shipbuilding between 1971 and 1980; another four ships were planned, but later canceled; instead they were joined by the Wasp-class amphibious assault ships.

As of March 2015, all vessels had been decommissioned. The Tarawa class were replaced by the America-class amphibious assault ships from 2014 onward while the Wasp class remains in service.

== Design ==
The vessels have a full load displacement of 39,967 tonnes (39,336 long tons; 44,056 short tons). Each ship is 834 feet (254 m) long, with a beam of 131.9 feet (40.2 m), and a draft of 25.9 feet (7.9 m).

Propulsion is provided by two Combustion Engineering boilers, connected to two Westinghouse turbines. These supply 70,000 horsepower (52,000 kW) to the ship's two propeller shafts. A Tarawa-class vessel can reach a maximum speed of 24 knots (44 km/h; 28 mph), and has a maximum range of 10,000 nautical miles (19,000 km; 12,000 mi) at 20 knots (37 km/h; 23 mph). In addition to the main propulsion system, the ships are fitted with a bow thruster.

As of 1998, the ships' armament consisted of a Mark 49 RAM surface-to-air missile system, two Vulcan Phalanx close-in weapons systems, six Mark 242 25 mm automatic cannons, and eight 12.7 mm machine guns. Previously, the amphibious warships were fitted with 2 Mark 25 Sea Sparrow missile systems (which were replaced by the Phalanx units), and three 5-inch (127 mm) Mk 45 lightweight guns in bow and starboard aft sponsons (the guns were removed across the class during 1997 and 1998). Countermeasures and decoys include four Mark 36 SRBOC launchers, a SLQ-25 Nixie towed torpedo decoy, a Sea Gnat unit, SLQ-49 chaff decoys.

The number of helicopters carried by each vessel was up to 19 Sikorsky CH-53 Sea Stallions, 26 Boeing Vertol CH-46 Sea Knight, or a mix of the two. The 820-by-118.1-foot (249.9 by 36.0 m) flight deck is fitted with two aircraft lifts, and up to nine Sea Stallions or 12 Sea Knights can be operated simultaneously. With a small amount of modification, the ships could carry and operate up to six McDonnell Douglas AV-8B Harrier II jump-jets.

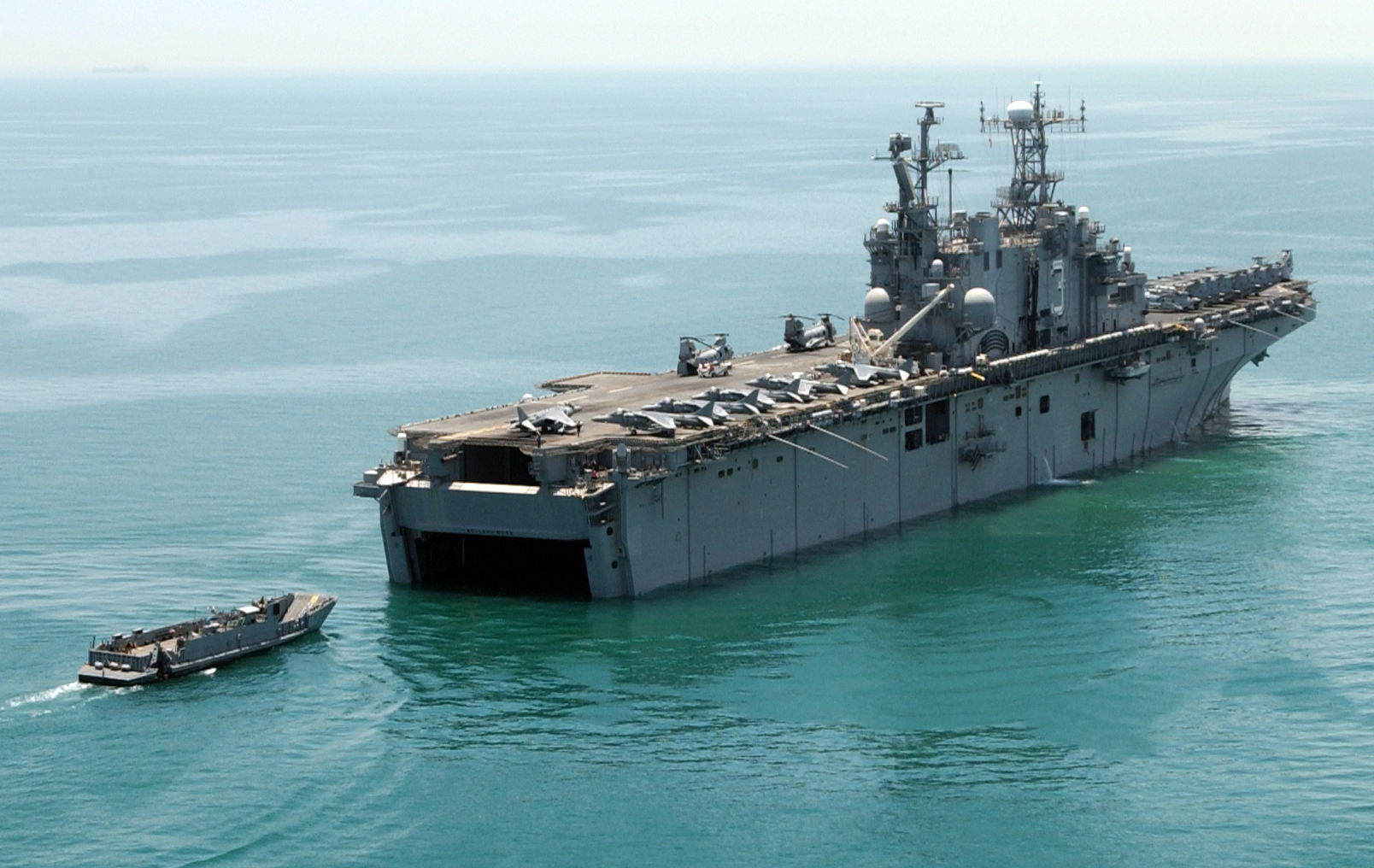
A LCU returning to USS Belleau Wood's well deck

The Tarawa-class ships are designed to embark a reinforced battalion of the United States Marine Corps and their equipment. Onboard accommodation is provided for up to 1,703 marines, while 33,730 cubic feet (955 m^{3}) is provided for the battalion's vehicles, and 116,900 cubic feet (3,310 m^{3}) is allocated for stores and other equipment. As well as deploying by helicopters, personnel and equipment can be embarked or offloaded via a 268-by-78-foot (82 by 24 m) well deck in each ship's stern. Up to four LCU 1610 landing craft can be transported in and operated from the well deck, along with other designs and combinations of landing craft (two LCU and two LCM-8, or 17 LCM-6, or 45 AAVP).

The Tarawa design was later repeated for the Wasp-class amphibious assault ships, with some changes. The main changes to the latter eight-ship class include the lower placement of the ship's bridge aboard the Wasps, the relocation of the command and control facilities to inside the hull, modifications to allow the operation of Harrier jump-jets and Landing Craft Air Cushion hovercraft, and removal of the 5-inch guns and their sponsons to increase the overall size of the flight deck.

== Construction ==
All five warships were built by Ingalls Shipbuilding, at this company's shipyard in Pascagoula, Mississippi. Tarawa was approved for construction during fiscal year 1969, with two more ships of this class ordered by Congress in the 1970 and 1971 fiscal years.

Design problems emerged early in the LHA program and contrary to the intent of the Total Package Procurement concept, the Navy became heavily involved in the design process. Nine ships were originally contracted for the Tarawa class, but that number was reduced to five in January 1971. The other four ships were never built for the Navy.

Work on the first warship of this class, USS Tarawa, began on 15 November 1971, and she was commissioned into the Navy on 29 May 1976. The last of the five ships, USS Peleliu, was completed on 3 May 1980.

== Decommissioning and replacement ==
The Tarawas began leaving service in 2005. By April 2011, four of the five amphibious assault ships had been decommissioned, leaving only Peleliu in active service. Peleliu was decommissioned on 31 March 2015 in San Diego.

The Tarawa class is to be replaced by the America class. The first America-class vessel was delivered and commissioned in 2014.

== Ships in class ==
Name	Hull number	Laid down	Launched	Commissioned	Decommissioned	Fate
Tarawa	LHA-1	15 November 1971	1 December 1973	29 May 1976	31 March 2009	Sunk as target ship on 19 July 2024
Saipan	LHA-2	21 July 1972	18 July 1974	15 October 1977	25 April 2007	Scrapped 2009
Belleau Wood (ex-Philippine Sea)	LHA-3	5 March 1973	11 April 1977	23 September 1978	28 October 2005	Sunk as target ship on 13 July 2006
Nassau (ex-Leyte Gulf)	LHA-4	13 August 1973	21 January 1978	28 July 1979	31 March 2011	Scrapped 30 April 2021
Peleliu (ex-Da Nang, ex-Khe Sanh)	LHA-5	12 November 1976	25 November 1978	3 May 1980	31 March 2015	Sunk as target ship on 17 July 2026
