= America-class amphibious assault ship =

Amphibious Assault Ship

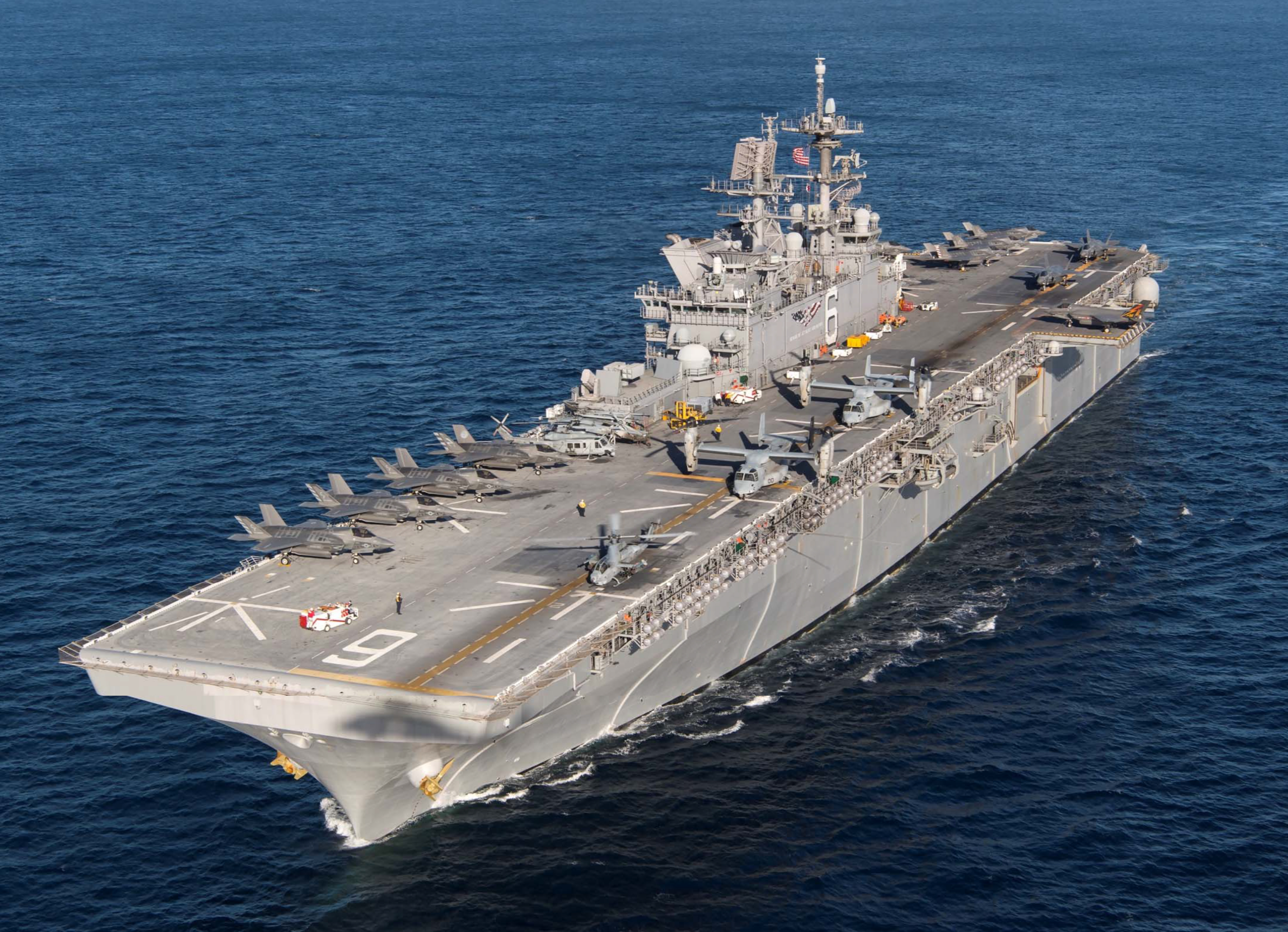
- USS America (LHA-6) sailing in 2018.

Class overview
- Builders: Huntington Ingalls Industries; Ingalls Shipbuilding Division
- Operators: United States Navy
- Preceded by: Wasp class
- Cost: US$10.094 billion – initial program cost for 3 ships ($3.4B/unit FY15)
- Built: 2008–
- In commission: 2014–
- Planned: 11
- Building: 2
- Completed: 2
- Active: 2

General characteristics
- Type: Amphibious assault ship with aircraft carrying capability
- Displacement: 44,971 long tons (45,693 t) full load
- Length: 844 ft (257 m)
- Beam: 106 ft (32 m)
- Propulsion: Two gas turbines, two shafts, with 70,000 bhp (52,000 kW) total; Two 5,000 hp (3,700 kW) auxiliary propulsion engines
- Speed: Over 20 knots (37 km/h; 23 mph)
- Complement: 65 officers, 994 enlisted; 1,687 Marines
- Sensors & processing systems: AN/SPS-49 2-D Air Search Radar; AN/SPS-48G 3-D Air Search Radar; AN/SPQ-9B Surface Search Radar; AN/USG-2 Cooperative Engagement Capability (CEC); SSDS MK2
- Electronic warfare & decoys: AN/SLQ-32B(V)2; 2 × Mk53 Nulka decoy launchers
- Armament: 2 × Rolling Airframe Missile launchers; 2 × Evolved Sea Sparrow Missile launchers; 2 × Phalanx CIWS; 3 × Mk 38 Machine Gun Systems; 7 × dual .50 caliber machine guns
- Aircraft carried: AV-8B Harrier II; F-35B Lightning II; MV-22B Osprey; CH-53E Super Stallion or; CH-53K King Stallion; UH-1Y Venom; AH-1Z Viper; MH-60S Knighthawk
- Aviation facilities: Hangar deck

The America class (formerly the LHA(R) class) is a ship class of landing helicopter assault (LHA) type amphibious assault ships for the United States Navy (USN). The class is designed to put ashore a Marine Expeditionary Unit using helicopters and MV-22B Osprey V/STOL transport aircraft, supported by AV-8B Harrier II or F-35 Lightning II V/STOL aircraft and various attack helicopters. The first of these warships was commissioned by the U.S. Navy in 2014 to replace USS Peleliu of the Tarawa class; as many as eleven will be built. The design of the America class is based on that of USS Makin Island, the last ship of the Wasp class, but the "Flight 0" ships of the America class will not have well decks, and have smaller sick bays to provide more space for aviation uses.

Although they carry only helicopters and V/STOL aircraft, the America class, with a displacement of about 45,000 long tons (46,000 t), is similar in size to the French Charles de Gaulle and the Indian INS Vikramaditya fixed-wing aircraft carriers. Also, while more than 124 feet (38 m) shorter, America class ships are of comparable displacement to the former US Navy Midway-class aircraft carriers.

Ships of the America class can be used as a small aircraft carrier with a squadron of jet fighters plus several multipurpose helicopters, such as the MH-60 Seahawk. They can carry about 20 to 25 AV-8B, F-35Bs, or a mixture of the two, but the future ships of this class, starting with USS Bougainville (LHA-8), will have smaller aircraft hangars to leave room for larger amphibious warfare well decks.

== Design ==
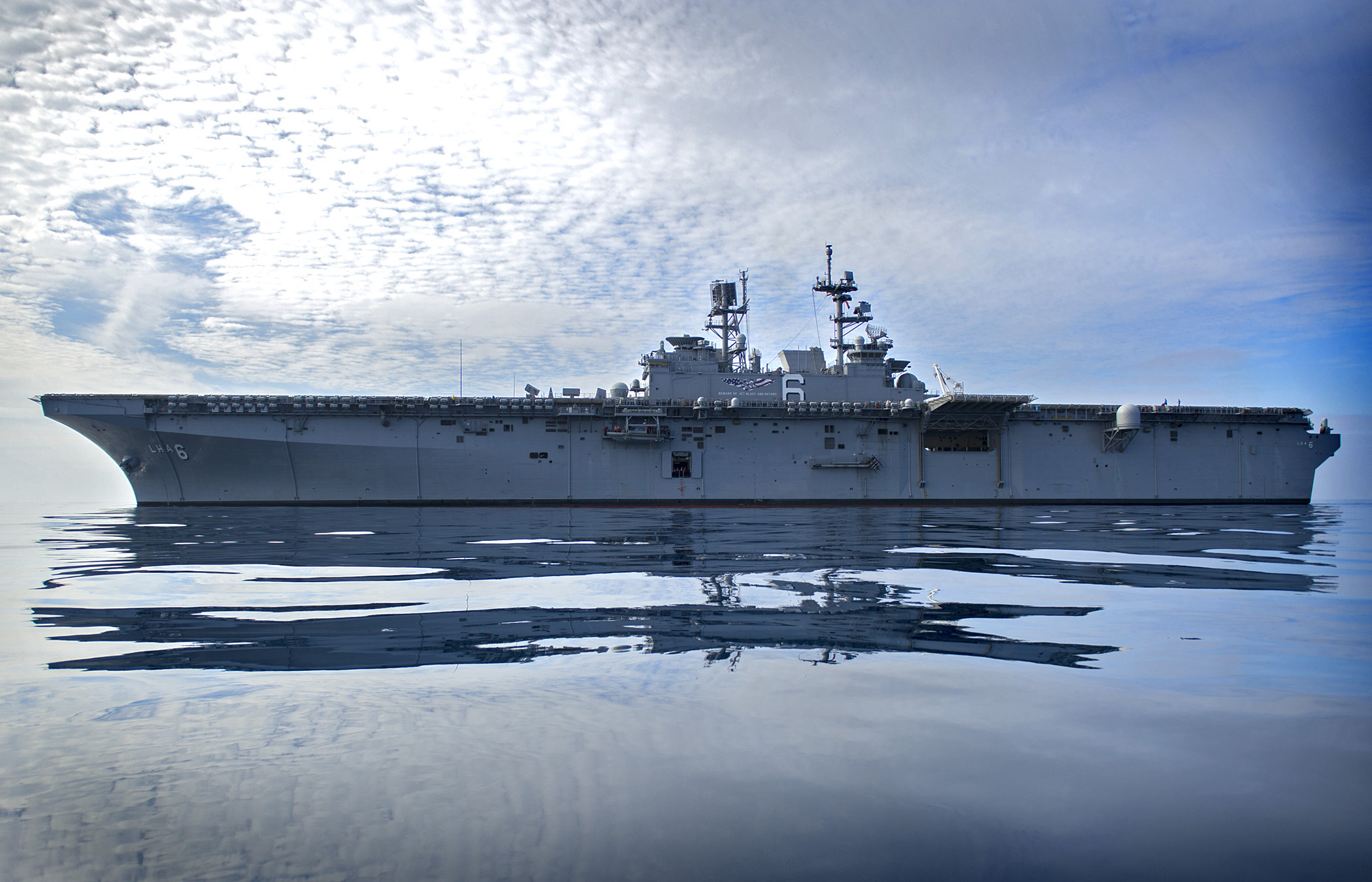
Profile view of USS America off San Diego on 9 November 2013

America is based on the design of USS Makin Island, herself an improved version of the Wasp-class amphibious assault ships with gas turbine power. About 45 percent of the "Flight 0" design of this class is based on that of Makin Island, but with its well deck omitted to allow more room for aircraft, spare parts, weapons and fuel. The gas turbines of Makin Island, America, and their successors use JP-5 fuel, which is the same fuel used by their helicopters, the jet engines of their AV-8B Harrier and MV-22 Osprey aircraft and, in new ships, the gas turbines of the Landing Craft Air Cushions (LCACs) that they could carry in their well decks, greatly simplifying the storage, distribution, and use of fuel.

The typical aircraft complement for the first two vessels is expected to be twelve MV-22B Osprey transports, six F-35B Lightning II STOVL multi-role jet aircraft, four CH-53K heavy transport helicopters, seven AH-1Z/UH-1Y attack/utility helicopters, and two Navy MH-60S Knighthawks for air-sea rescue. The exact make-up of the ship's aircraft complements may vary according to their missions. They can carry about 20 AV-8Bs or F-35Bs, and 2 MH-60Ss, to serve as a small aircraft carrier as demonstrated by landing helicopter dock (LHD) operations in Operation Iraqi Freedom.

The U.S. Marine Corps is now more concerned about anti-ship missile attacks from fast attack craft and long-range precision fires from land. To counter such attacks the Marine Corps wants to keep amphibious ships farther offshore. For this Marines will be transported ashore in larger and longer range MV-22 V/STOL aircraft. To accommodate these requirements, America has twice the displacement of the retired Iwo Jima-class amphibious assault ships.

The America-class amphibious assault ships are engineered with a CODLOG hybrid-electric propulsion system derived from the one used on Makin Island. The ships can use gas-turbines for high speeds and the diesel-electric engines when required. Setting the beam of America at 106 feet (32 m) was dictated by the need for these ships to pass through the Panama Canal. The Congressional Budget Office found that if before 2040 the price of oil reached and remained above $140 per barrel then the use of nuclear propulsion for LHX-class ships would be more cost-effective.

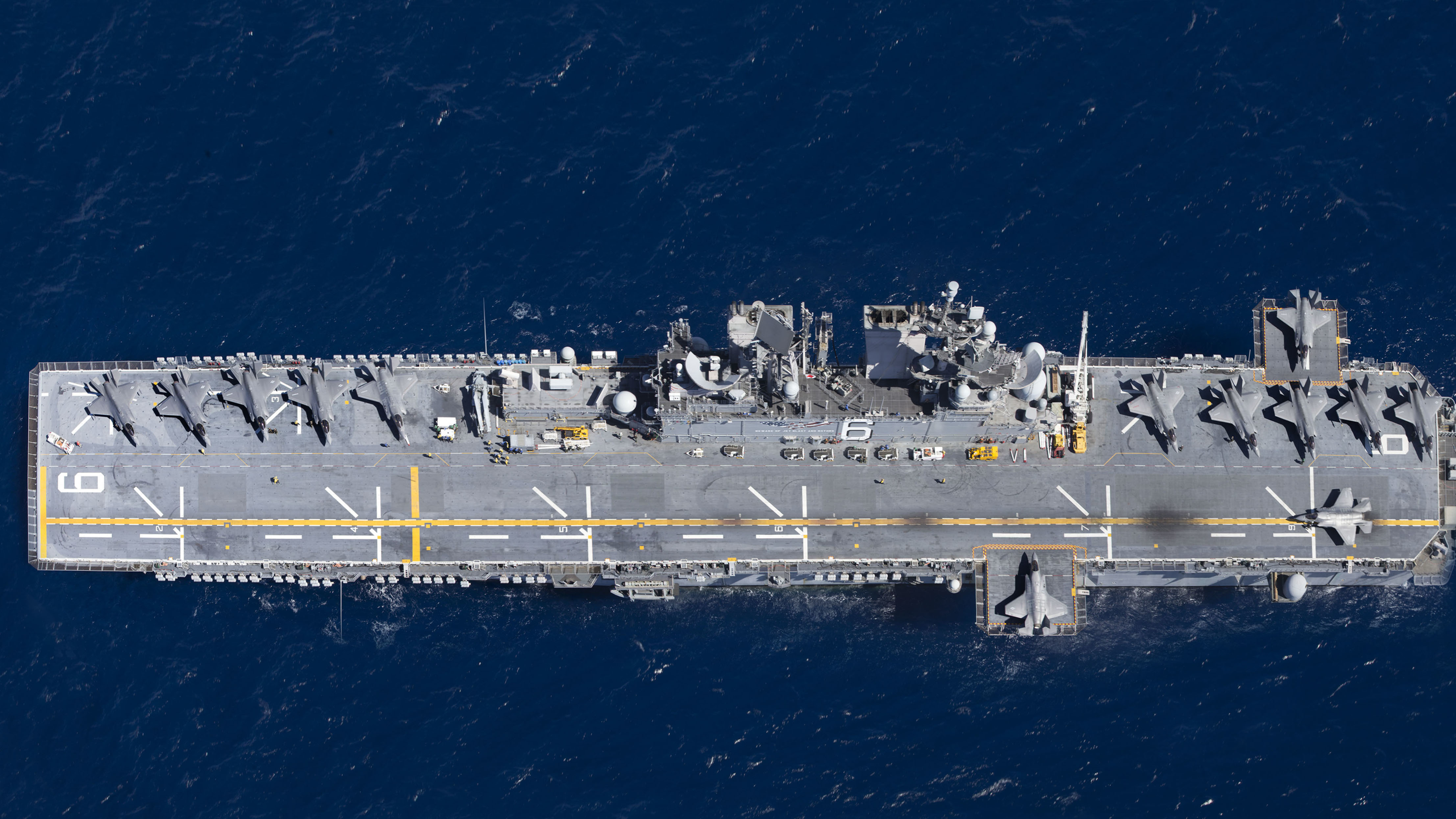
USMC Lockheed F-35Bs aboard USS America on 8 October 2019

The LHX or LH(X) was a warship that was proposed in the late 1990s to replace the Tarawa-class amphibious assault ships, but with a dry deck for hovercraft rather than a floodable "well deck". After 2000, the LHX, the "Amphibious Assault Ship Future Replacement", was put forward to replace all of the LHDs. The new LHX could be a Flight 2 design of the America class built with a well deck and a smaller island superstructure, which would give it 20 percent more capacity on the flight deck. This would remove the current restriction on MV-22s to land on spots 5 and 6, and also giving room for four MV-22B, three F-35B Lightning IIs, or three CH-53Ks to use the flight deck. In 2008, the procurement of Flight 2 ships was tentatively planned for 2024.

A modified version of the design of America, designated the MPF(F), LHA(R), or T-LHA(R), was proposed for two ships of the Maritime Prepositioning Force (Future). The MPF(F) is the Navy's concept for a "sea base" to support operations ashore starting in about 2025. These two ships would hypothetically be crewed by civilians from the Military Sealift Command and not armed with weapons. Funding for the MPF(F) and the LHA(R) was tabled by the Senate Armed Services Committee in the fiscal year 2008 budget. The U.S. Navy now intends to buy more ships of the America class for its fleet of amphibious warfare ships.

In January 2014, the U.S. Navy began taking measures on America in order to reduce damage from excessive heat given off by the F-35B and MV-22 to prolong the life of the flight deck. The F-35B engine gives off much more heat than the previous AV-8B Harrier STOVL fighter and the MV-22 Osprey's heat exhaust has been known to damage flight decks. Plans include 14 different modifications to the ship and limiting the number of flight operations that are conducted off the deck. The U.S. Navy is looking for cost-effective solutions that will not affect the combat effectiveness of America. Restricting the number of flight operations is not expected to decrease its usefulness as amphibious assault ships are made to support quick assaults, while full-sized aircraft carriers have the mission of conducting sustained air operations. Lessons learned from these measures will be applied to Tripoli and Bougainville under construction, which will allow them to perform "complete unrestricted operations." Minor modifications to America are as small as putting covers over life rafts and refueling stations and moving antennas.

=== Well deck ===
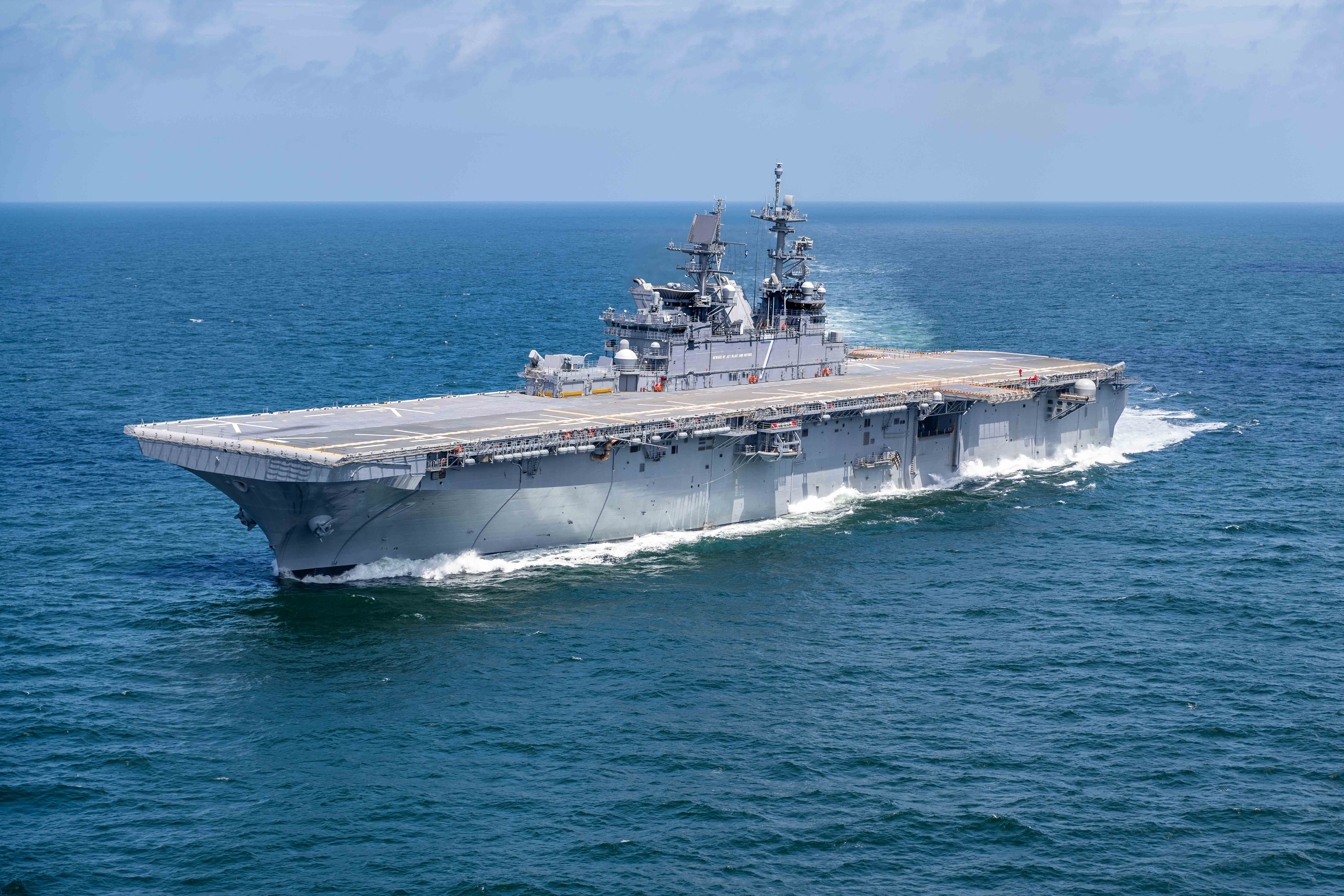
USS Tripoli underway on 15 July 2019

Further warships in this class will have a well deck for amphibious warfare in their sterns to contain landing craft, such as the LCAC, as in Tarawa-class LHAs and Wasp-class amphibious assault ships.

The addition of a well deck will leave less space for aircraft on board the ships, but the "Early Operational Assessment" of 2005 criticized the "Flight 0" design because the expanded aviation facilities gave no space for a well deck. Also, USS America has reduced stowage space for military vehicles, and the size of its hospital was reduced by two-thirds with respect to the Wasp-class ships.

Before he became the Under Secretary of the Navy, Robert O. Work also brought into question the usefulness of an amphibious warfare ship without a well deck. The concept of the landing platform helicopter (LPH) had failed when their helicopters met enemy anti-aircraft systems off the coast of Lebanon during the late 1970s. In that case, Marines first had to be moved onto ships that had well decks.

The third ship of the class (USS Bougainville) will be the first in its class with a well deck for deploying amphibious vehicles. While there was emphasis on lighter ground vehicles in the late 1990s, up-armored and heavier vehicles were used during operations in Iraq and Afghanistan. Future counterinsurgency operations require ships that can carry and deliver those vehicles, including through use of shore connectors; cargo lift requirements are met more expensively by aircraft airlifting equipment. Adding the well deck will require the ship's island to be slightly smaller compared to its two predecessors. Early design work with funds began in 2015, detailed design work and construction started in 2017, and the LHA-8 will enter service in 2026, delayed from the original schedule of October 2024.

== History ==
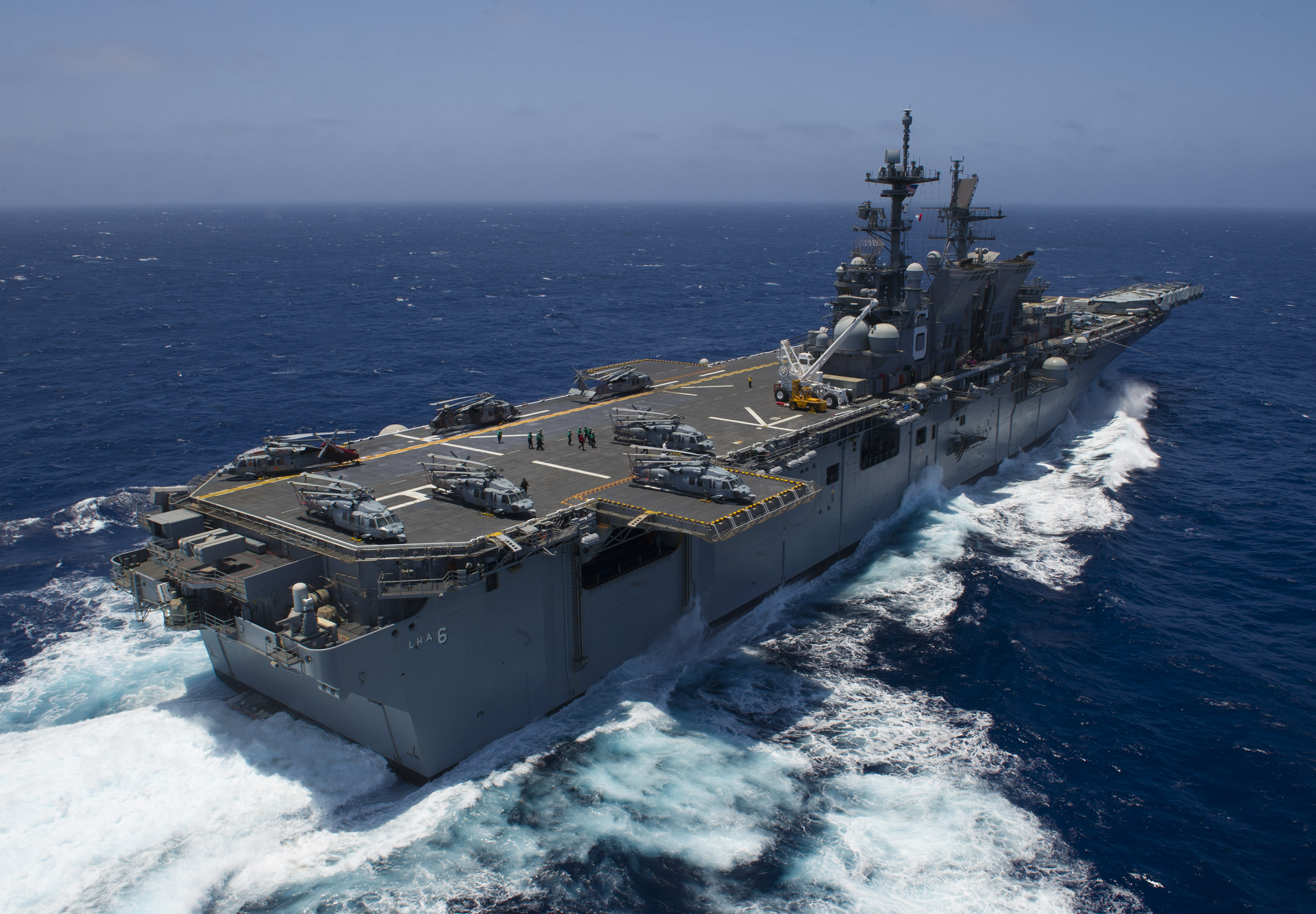
The stern of USS America in 2016

The program started in July 2001, with development beginning in October 2005, the production decision was made in January 2006, and construction of LHA-6 began in December 2008.

Northrop Grumman Shipbuilding was awarded $48.1M for "additional planning and advanced engineering services in support of the LHA replacement (LHA[R]) Flight 0 amphibious assault ship (LHA-7)" on 28 October 2010, to run until May 2012. It was scheduled for delivery in 2017. In January 2011, development problems led to the F-35B program being delayed two years, and plans for LHA-7 could change if the F-35B were to be canceled.

In April 2012, Contract N00024-10-C-2229 was issued to Huntington Ingalls Industries, in which funding for steel plate purchases for LHA-7 was planned, and announced the requirement for an additional four ships (to LHA-10).

On 4 May 2012, Secretary of the Navy Ray Mabus announced the selection of USS Tripoli as the name for the Navy's next large-deck amphibious assault ship (LHA-7). On 20 June 2014, Ingalls Shipyards, authenticated Tripoli's keel in ceremony by the ship's sponsor, Lynne Mabus, wife of Secretary of the Navy, Ray Mabus. Tripoli was officially delivered to the U.S. Navy on 28 February 2020.

On 13 June 2014, the U.S. Department of Defense announced that it had awarded a contract worth for $23.5 million to General Dynamics National Steel and Shipbuilding Co., San Diego, California for design and development work on LHA-8.

On 14 December 2021, a $70.8 million U.S. Navy contract was awarded to Huntington Ingalls as its latest installment toward acquiring long-lead-time materials for LHA-9. The award was offered by the Naval Sea Systems Command, Washington, D.C.

On 27 October 2022, the U.S. Navy awarded Ingalls Shipbuilding a $2.4 billion contract modification for detail, design, and construction of LHA-9. The ship's name was announced as USS Fallujah on 13 December 2022.

LHA-10 was authorized by the U.S. Congress in 2023, providing $US1.38 billion for her procurement. The ship was named by Secretary of the Navy Carlos Del Toro on 2 May 2024, USS Helmand Province.

In July, 2025 the Navy and HII-Ingalls announced that the next two America-class ships, Bougainville & Fallujah, would be facing a one-year delay in construction and delivery due to "shipyard labor challenges" and budget changes. Bougainville will now be delivered in July 2027 and Fallujah in July 2031, instead of its earlier projection of September 2030.

== Ships in class ==
Ship	Hull Number	Builder	Laid down	Launched	Commissioned	Homeport	Status
Flight 0
America	LHA-6	Ingalls Shipbuilding, Pascagoula	17 July 2009	4 June 2012	11 October 2014	San Diego, California	In active service
Tripoli	LHA-7	Ingalls Shipbuilding, Pascagoula	22 June 2014	1 May 2017	15 July 2020	Sasebo, Nagasaki	In active service
Flight I
Bougainville	LHA-8	Ingalls Shipbuilding, Pascagoula	14 March 2019	30 September 2023	Estimated in 2027	Norfolk, Virginia	Fitting Out
Fallujah	LHA-9	Ingalls Shipbuilding, Pascagoula	20 September 2023		Estimated in 2031		Under construction
Helmand Province	LHA-10	Ingalls Shipbuilding, Pascagoula					Authorized

== See also ==
- List of aircraft carriers in service

Equivalent amphibious warfare ships of the same era

- Type 075
- Trieste class
- Canberra class
- Juan Carlos I class
- Project 23900
- Anadolu class
