= USS Tripoli (LHA-7) =

America-class amphibious assault ship

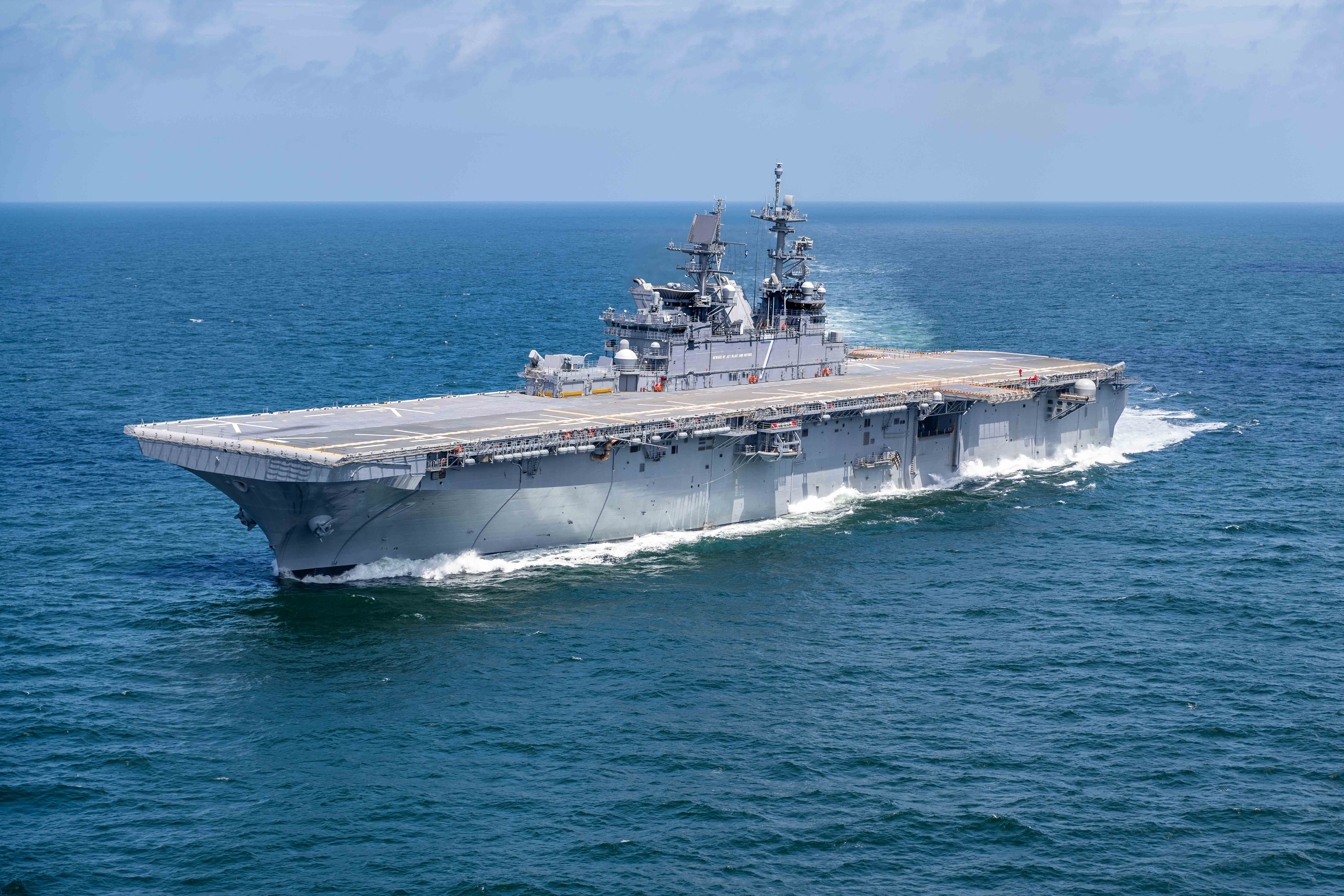
- USS Tripoli underway in July 2019

History

United States
- Name: Tripoli
- Namesake: Battle of Derne
- Awarded: 31 May 2012
- Builder: Huntington Ingalls Industries
- Laid down: 20 June 2014
- Launched: 1 May 2017
- Sponsored by: Lynne Mabus
- Christened: 16 September 2017
- Acquired: 28 February 2020
- Commissioned: 15 July 2020
- Home port: Sasebo
- Identification: Callsign: NEEE; Hull number: LHA-7
- Motto: In ære terram marique; (In the Air, on Land, and Sea)
- Status: in active service
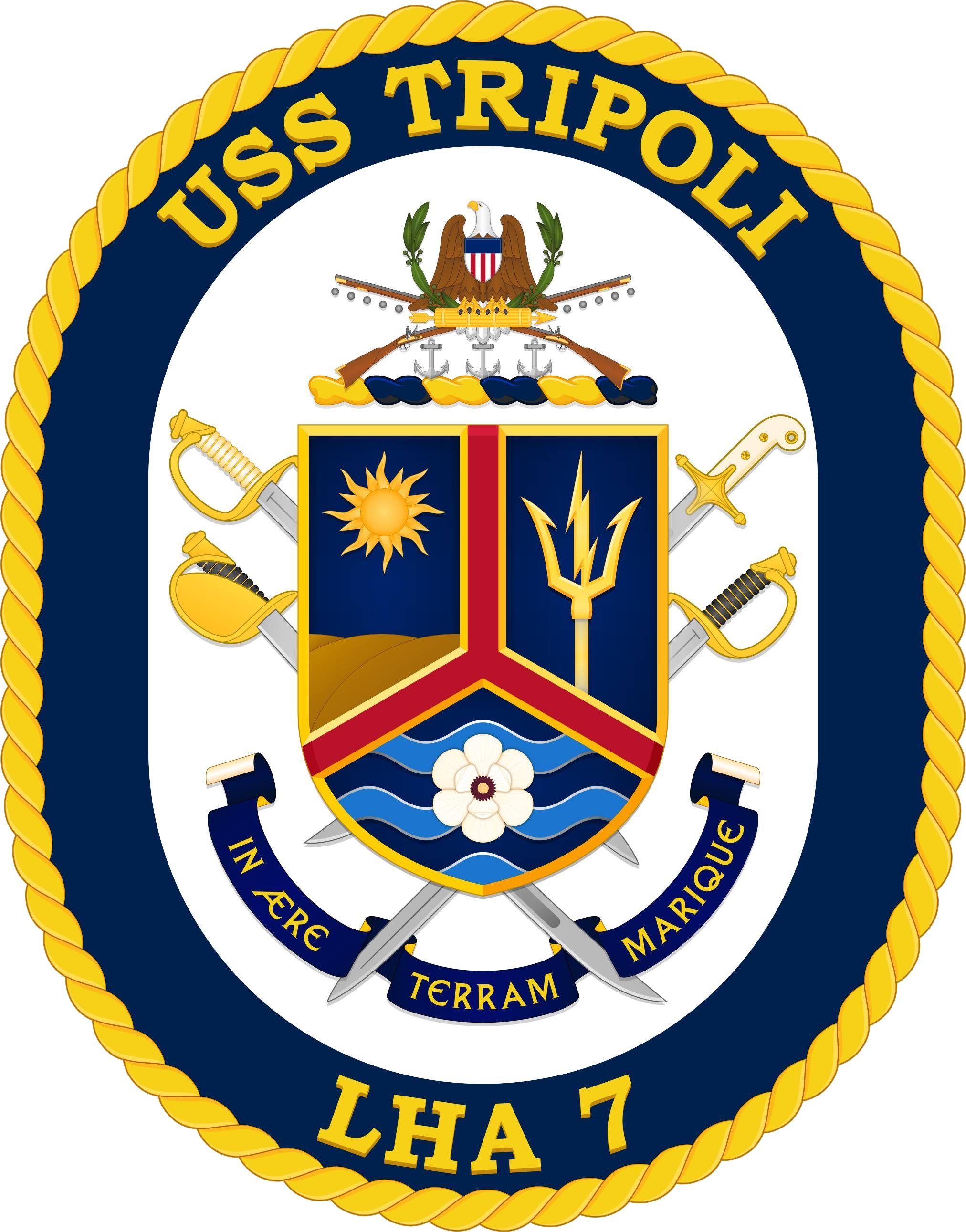
- Badge

General characteristics
- Class & type: America-class amphibious assault ship
- Displacement: 44,971 long tons (45,693 t)
- Length: 844 ft (257 m)
- Beam: 106 ft (32 m)
- Draft: 26 ft (7.9 m) (7.9 meters)
- Propulsion: Two marine gas turbines, two shafts, 70,000 bhp (52,000 kW), two 5,000 hp (3,700 kW) auxiliary propulsion motors.
- Speed: 22 knots (41 km/h; 25 mph)+
- Complement: 102 officers, 1,102 enlisted; 1,687 Marines (plus 184 surge)
- Sensors & processing systems: AN/SPQ-9B fire-control radar; AN/SPS-48E air-search radar
- Electronic warfare & decoys: AN/SLQ-32B(V)2; 2 × Mk53 Nulka decoy launchers
- Armament: 2 × Rolling Airframe Missile launchers; 2 × Evolved Sea Sparrow Missile launchers; 2 × 20 mm Phalanx CIWS mounts; 7 × twin .50 BMG machine guns
- Aircraft carried: AV-8B Harrier II; MV-22B Osprey; F-35B Lightning II; CH-53K King Stallion; UH-1Y Venom; AH-1Z Viper; MH-60S Knighthawk

USS Tripoli (LHA-7) is the second America-class amphibious assault ship built for the United States Navy. In May 2012, United States Secretary of the Navy Ray Mabus announced the ship's name as Tripoli, in honor of the US Marine Corps victory against Tripoli at the Battle of Derna during the First Barbary War. This is the third US Naval ship to carry the name, the first being USS Tripoli (CVE-64), an escort carrier from World War II and the second being USS Tripoli (LPH-10), an amphibious assault ship that served during the Cold War, Operation Desert Storm, and Operation Restore Hope.

== Design and construction ==
The design of Tripoli is based on USS Makin Island, which is an improved version of the Wasp-class amphibious assault ship. Approximately 45% of the Flight 0 design is based on USS Makin Island, with the well deck removed to allow more room for aircraft and aviation fuel. The removal of the well deck for landing craft allows for an extended hangar deck with two significantly wider high bay areas, each fitted with an overhead crane for aircraft maintenance.

Other enhancements include a reconfigurable command and control complex, an on-board hospital, and numerous aviation support spaces. The design of Tripoli features an enlarged hangar deck, realignment and expansion of the aviation maintenance facilities, and a significant increase in her available stowage for parts and support equipment. She was intended to be the first LHA replacement ship to deliver fully ready to integrate the entire future air combat element of the U.S. Marine Corps to include the F-35B Lightning II, but construction delays pushed final F-35 capability installs until delivery.

Tripoli was built by Ingalls Shipbuilding (Huntington Ingalls Industries) at the company's shipyard in Pascagoula, Mississippi. Fabrication of ship components began in July 2013. The ship's keel was laid in a ceremony on 20 June 2014 in Pascagoula. Tripoli was launched on 1 May and christened on 16 September 2017, with Lynne Mabus, wife of former Navy Secretary Ray Mabus, as her sponsor. Tripoli was delivered to the Navy, later than scheduled, on 28 February 2020.

== Service history ==
In September 2020, Tripoli completed a homeport shift from Pascagoula, Mississippi to San Diego, California.

On 2 May 2022, Tripoli departed Naval Station San Diego for the Western Pacific Ocean on her maiden deployment, taking on 20 F-35Bs at one point, in a test of the "lightning carrier" concept. On 25 July 2022, she transitioned to an amphibious ready role by embarking the 31st Marine Expeditionary Unit at Naval Base Okinawa, Japan, before transiting the South China Sea to make a port call at Singapore's Changi Naval Base on 31 August 2022. She returned to San Diego on 29 November 2022.

In February 2025, Tripoli was confirmed to be deploying to Sasebo, Japan as the forward-deployed amphibious warship, replacing America.

=== COVID-19 pandemic ===
During the COVID-19 pandemic, on 17 April 2020, Navy officials stated that at least nine sailors assigned to the ship had tested positive for SARS-CoV-2 while the ship was docked in Pascagoula, Mississippi. (Note: It is unclear whether the sailors had tested positive before or after delivery of the ship, with one source stating that "the ship was set to be delivered ... and hundreds of sailors moved aboard in mid-March".) About 630 sailors were moved off the ship as a preventative measure, and the outbreak spread to only "around a couple dozen sailors". Due to the pandemic the ship's public commissioning ceremony, originally planned for NAS Pensacola in June, was cancelled, and Tripoli was commissioned on 15 July 2020 in Pascagoula, Mississippi, where she had been built.

=== 2026 Iran war ===
On 28 March 2026 Tripoli arrived in the US Central Command (CENTCOM) 'area of responsibility'—which spans north-east Africa, the Middle East and central and south Asia—to provide support for Operation Epic Fury. Tripoli is part of an amphibious ready group (ARG), consisting of USS San Diego and USS New Orleans according to USNI News. The ARG is reportedly transporting around 2,200 Marine Corps personnel from the Okinawa-based 31st Marine Expeditionary Unit (MEU) and will join the USS Abraham Lincoln-led Carrier Strike Group 3 which is already deployed in the region. The embarked air wing of Tripoli includes around 20 F-35B Lightning II fighters of the VMFA-121 “Green Knights”, MV-22B Osprey of the VMM-265 "Dragons" and MH-60S Seahawk from HSC-25 "Island Knights".

The ship had departed Okinawa on 11 March as per MarineTraffic and reached near Singapore, approaching the northern exit of the Strait of Malacca, on 17 March 2026 as per the AIS tracking data accessed by the CNN. San Diego and New Orleans crossed the strait one day prior to Tripoli. As of 20 March, the ship is located to the south of Sri Lanka and is expected to enter the Arabian Sea the following week. The ship will reach the war theatre around 22–23 March.

On 19 April 2026, as the U.S. Navy was maintaining the naval blockade of Iran, Tripoli along with the Arleigh Burke-class destroyer USS Spruance disabled the Iranian-flagged Touska. Tripoli had deployed US Marines to board the ship and take control of the vessel.

== Awards ==
- Admiral James Flatley Memorial Award for Naval Aviation Safety – (2022)
- CNO Afloat Safety Award (PACFLT) – (2023)

== Etymology ==
Tripoli is the third U.S. Navy ship named for the Battle of Derne in 1805. It was the decisive victory of a mercenary army led by a detachment of United States Marines and soldiers against the forces of Tripoli during the First Barbary War. It was the first recorded land battle of the United States fought overseas. Fallujah, after the Second Battle of Fallujah, was suggested as a name but was ultimately not chosen. This name was given to another America-class ship, LHA-9.
