= Iwo Jima-class amphibious assault ship =

Amphibious assault ship class of the United States Navy

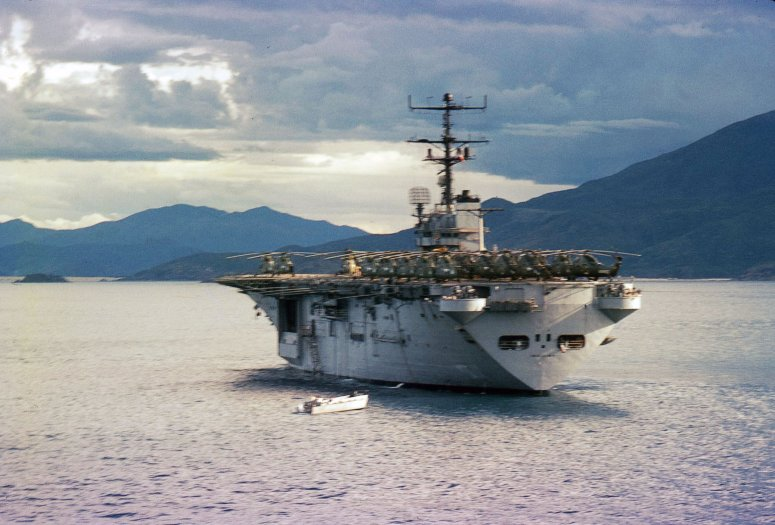
- USS Iwo Jima (LPH-2), the lead ship of the class, off the coast of South Vietnam in 1965.

Class overview
- Builders: Puget Sound Naval Shipyard; Philadelphia Naval Shipyard; Ingalls Shipbuilding
- Operators: United States Navy
- Preceded by: Essex class (some ships converted)
- Succeeded by: Tarawa class
- In commission: 1961–2002
- Completed: 7
- Retired: 7

General characteristics
- Type: Amphibious assault ship (LPH)
- Displacement: 18,474 tons (full); 11,000 tons (light)
- Length: 592 ft (180 m)
- Beam: 84 ft (26 m)
- Draft: 27 ft (8.2 m)
- Propulsion: 2 × 600 psi (4.1 MPa) boilers, one geared steam turbine, one shaft, 22,000 shaft horsepower (16 MW)
- Speed: 22 knots (41 km/h)
- Troops: 2,157
- Complement: 667
- Armament: Initially: 2 × 2 3-inch (76 mm) / 50-caliber DP guns, 8 cell Sea Sparrow BPDMS launchers, Later: 2 × Phalanx CIWS
- Aviation facilities: 25 helicopters or AV-8 Harriers; Flight deck width: 105 ft (32 m)

The Iwo Jima-class amphibious assault ships of the United States Navy were the first amphibious assault ships designed and built as dedicated helicopter carriers, capable of operating up to 20 helicopters to carry up to 1,800 marines ashore. They were named for battles featuring the United States Marine Corps, starting with the Battle of Iwo Jima. The first ship of the class was commissioned in 1961, and the last was decommissioned in 2002. The hull classification of "LPH" stands for "Landing Platform Helicopter".

== Operational history ==
Ships of this class participated in several conflicts and peacekeeping and humanitarian relief operations:

- Nuclear weapons test support, Johnston Atoll 1962
- Cuban Missile Crisis 1962
- Vietnam War 1963–1973
- Dominican Civil War 1965
- Gemini and Apollo spacecraft recovery 1966–1975
- Iran hostage crisis 1980
- Multinational Force in Lebanon, 1982–1983
- Operation Urgent Fury, Grenada, 1983
- Operation Earnest Will, Persian Gulf 1987–1988
- Operation Sharp Edge, Liberia, 1990
- Gulf War 1990–1991
- Operation Eastern Exit, Somalia, 1991
- Operation Restore Hope, Somalia, 1993
- Operation Continue Hope, Somalia, 1994
- Operation Deny Flight, Bosnia, 1994
- Operation Uphold Democracy, Haiti, 1994
- Operation Vigilant Warrior, Kuwait, 1994
- Operation Assured Response, Liberia, 1996

One ship of this class, USS Guam (LPH-9), was used in a 1970-1974 Sea Control Ship experiment to test the concept of a smaller aircraft carrier using V/STOL aircraft.

Another ship, USS Inchon (LPH-12), was converted to a mine countermeasures ship which hosted mine sweeping helicopters.

The hull design of the Iwo Jima-class also became the basis of the slightly larger Blue Ridge class of amphibious command ships.

== Ships in class ==
| Name | Hull number | Builder | Laid down | Launched | Commissioned | Decommissioned | Fate |
|---|---|---|---|---|---|---|---|
| Iwo Jima | LPH-2 | Puget Sound Naval Shipyard, Bremerton | 2 April 1959 | 17 September 1960 | 26 August 1961 | 14 July 1993 | Broken up at Brownsville, 1996 |
| Okinawa | LPH-3 | Philadelphia Naval Shipyard, Philadelphia | 1 April 1960 | 19 August 1961 | 14 April 1962 | 17 December 1992 | Sunk as target, 6 June 2002 |
| Guadalcanal | LPH-7 | Philadelphia Naval Shipyard, Philadelphia | 1 September 1961 | 16 March 1963 | 20 July 1963 | 31 August 1994 | Sunk as target, 19 May 2005 |
| Guam | LPH-9 | Philadelphia Naval Shipyard, Philadelphia | 15 November 1962 | 22 August 1964 | 16 January 1965 | 25 August 1998 | Sunk as target, 16 October 2001 |
| Tripoli | LPH-10 | Ingalls Shipbuilding, Pascagoula | 15 June 1964 | 31 July 1965 | 6 August 1966 | 15 September 1995 | Broken up at Brownsville, 2018 |
| New Orleans | LPH-11 | Philadelphia Naval Shipyard, Philadelphia | 1 March 1966 | 3 February 1968 | 16 November 1968 | 31 October 1997 | Sunk as target, 10 July 2010 |
| Inchon | LPH-12 | Ingalls Shipbuilding, Pascasgoula | 8 April 1968 | 24 May 1969 | 20 June 1970 | 20 June 2002 | Sunk as target, 5 December 2004 |

The seven ships of the Iwo Jima class were given non-sequential hull numbers, as, at the time of their construction, five existing aircraft carriers were being converted to serve in the Landing Platform Helicopter role - these five ships were renumbered, with the new ships slotted into a single sequence. The five existing ships were:

| Name | Previous hull number | New hull number |
|---|---|---|
| Block Island | CVE-106 | LPH-1 (Note: Block Island was redesignated from CVE-106 to LPH-1 in anticipation of the ship being converted into the LPH role under project SCB 159. However, before the work could begin, the ship's conversion was cancelled, and it reverted back to its original number.) |
| Boxer | CV-21 | LPH-4 |
| Princeton | CV-37 | LPH-5 |
| Thetis Bay | CVE-90 | LPH-6 |
| Valley Forge | CV-45 | LPH-8 |
