= Amphibious assault ship =

Type of warship

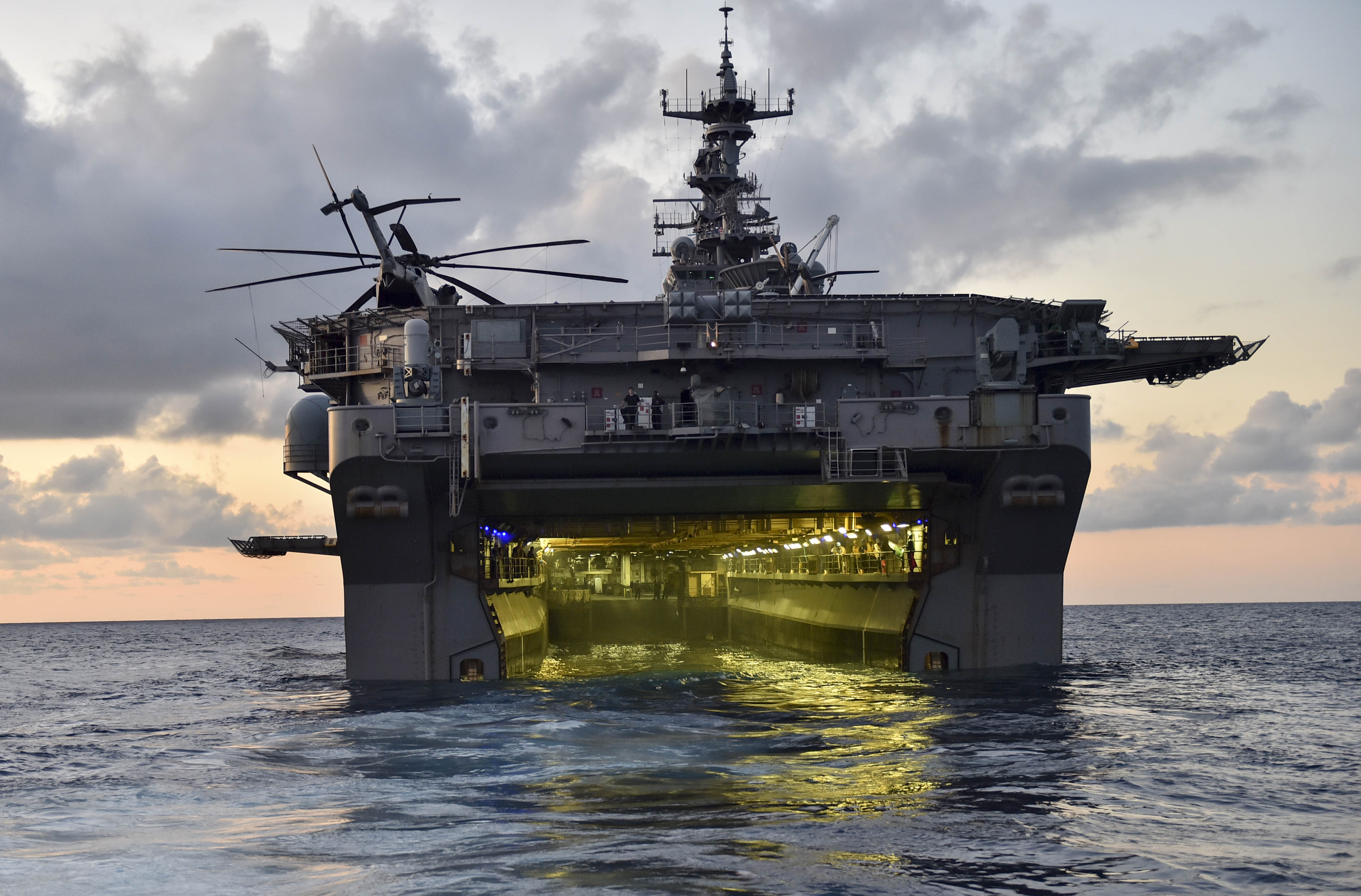
The well deck of USS Iwo Jima seen from a deployed landing craft

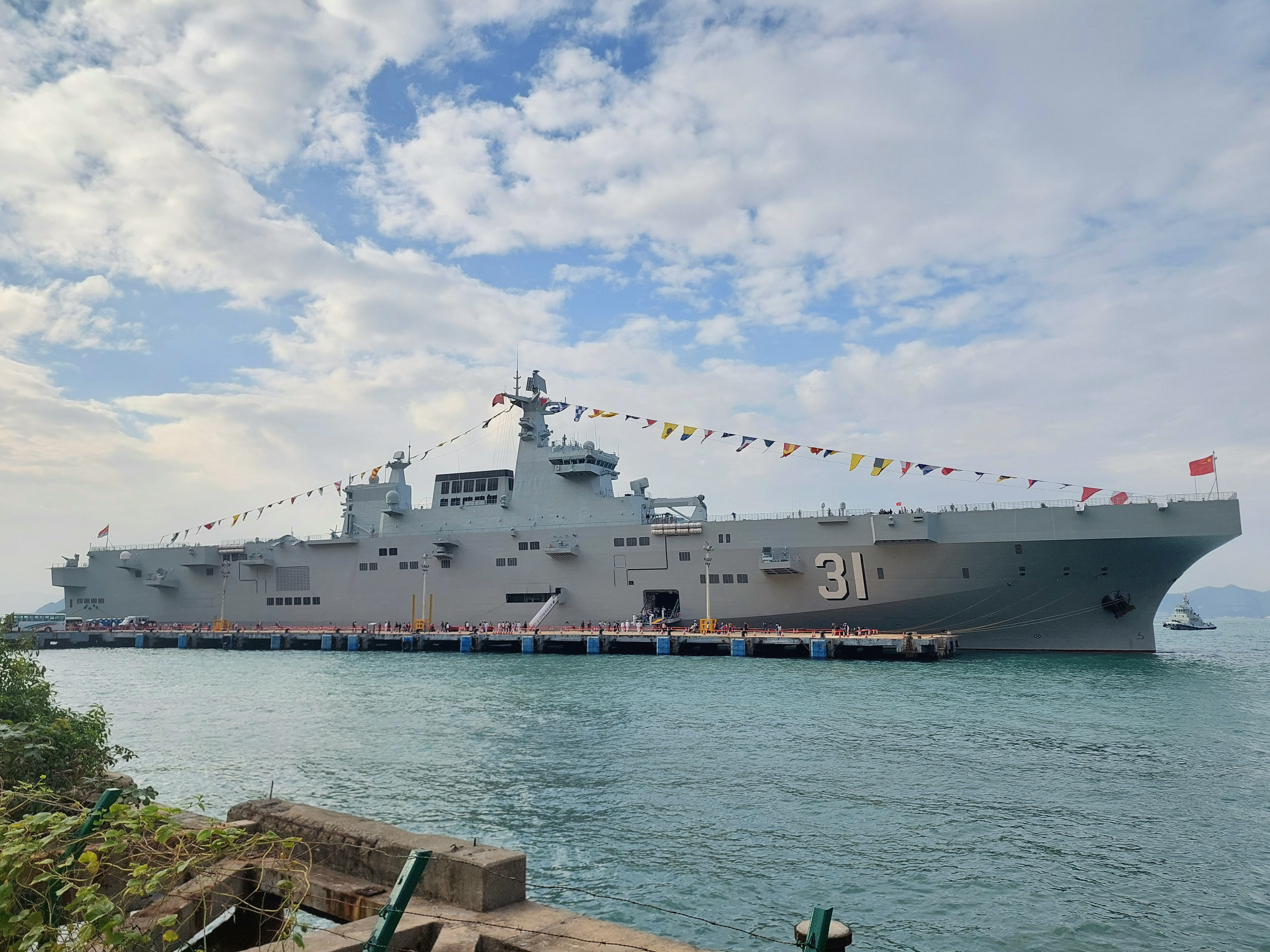
Hainan, a Type 075 class amphibious assault ship of the People's Liberation Army Navy

An amphibious assault ship (AAS) is a type of amphibious warfare ship designed for spearheading amphibious incursions of marines into enemy territories during an armed conflict, via launching either naval landings or air assaults and also by providing shipborne close air support and logistics for landed friendly forces. Such a ship is typically the capital ship of a dedicated fleet known as the amphibious ready group or expeditionary strike group.

Amphibious assault ships evolved from aircraft carriers converted for specific use as helicopter carriers, which, as a result, are often mistaken for conventional fixed-wing aircraft carriers. Like the aircraft carriers they were developed from, some amphibious assault ships also support V/STOL fixed-wing aircraft, and some latest models (e.g. China's Type 076) have catapult systems for assisted takeoff of fixed-wing light aircraft such as UCAVs and have a secondary role as drone carriers. Most modern AAS designs also carry landing craft with most including a well deck, usually at the stern, to support large LCACs (hovercraft) and LCUs, which can insert both infantry and combat vehicles directly onto land.

The role of the amphibious assault ship is fundamentally different from that of a standard aircraft carrier: the aviation facilities of AASs have the primary role of hosting V/STOL aircraft (mainly helicopters and tiltrotors) for large-scale troop landing and some close air support, while conventional aircraft carriers are designed primarily for fast cyclic sorties of carrier-based combat aircraft (mostly fixed-wings) whose main roles are air superiority and airstrikes. Some AASs are capable of serving in the sea-control role, embarking more anti-submarine helicopters to clear the path for other friendly warships, while also operating as a safe seaborne base for large numbers of STOVL strike aircraft like the Harrier or the F-35B for combat air patrol and providing air support for an expeditionary unit ashore.

The largest fleet of amphibious assault ships is operated by the United States Navy, including the Wasp class dating back to 1989 and the very similar America-class ships which entered service in 2014. Just as an aircraft carrier leads a carrier strike group in the US Navy, an amphibious assault ship leads an expeditionary strike group. Amphibious assault ships are also operated by the Chinese People's Liberation Army Navy, the British Royal Navy, the French Navy, the Italian Navy, the Spanish Navy, the Royal Australian Navy, the Brazilian Navy, the Egyptian Navy, the Republic of Korea Navy (South Korea) and the Turkish Naval Forces.

The term amphibious assault ship is often used interchangeably with other ship classifications. The United States Navy hull classification currently categorizes full-length flight decked ("carrier-type") amphibious warfare ships into three classes, namely the landing platform helicopter (LPH), landing helicopter assault (LHA) and landing helicopter dock (LHD), all regarded as amphibious assault ships.

== History ==
=== World War II ===
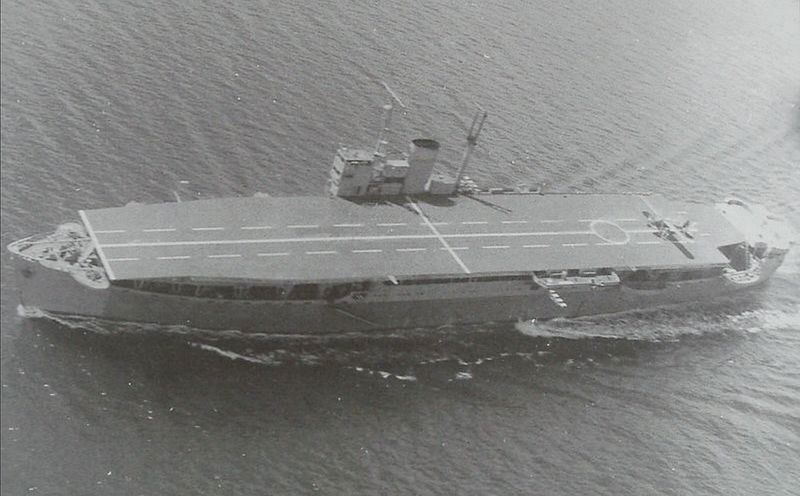
The Akitsu Maru of the Imperial Japanese Army

In the Pacific theater of World War II, escort carriers would often escort the landing ships and troop carriers during the island-hopping campaign. In this role, they would provide air cover for the troopships and fly the first wave of attacks on the beach fortifications in amphibious landing operations. On occasion, they would escort the large carriers, serving as emergency airstrips and providing fighter cover for their larger sisters while these were busy readying or refueling their own planes. They would also transport aircraft and spare parts from the US to the remote island airstrips.

The Imperial Japanese Army had its own landing ships, independent of the Navy, the "landing craft carriers" (officially named "Army Special Purpose Ship"), which were designed to deploy multiple landing craft, such as the Daihatsu-class landing craft and other small boats in short order.

First, Shinshū Maru, completed in 1934 as the world's first purpose-built landing ship, was able to deploy landing craft via cranes and a floodable well dock, and was initially designed to launch seaplanes, but those facilities were never installed. It was succeeded by three standardized classes of ship, the "Type A" with the same capacities as Shinshū Maru but with a larger size and resembling cargo liners (six completed), the "Type B", being similar to the Type A but smaller (one completed), and the "Type C", which instead of resembling cargo liners, had a flight deck, able to launch small STOL planes and autogyros for combat air patrol, aerial reconnaissance and close air support of the landing troops, similar in role to a limited escort carrier (two completed).

The two ships of the Type C, Akitsu Maru and Kumano Maru, completed in 1942 and 1945 respectively, had full-length flight decks in addition to the floodable well deck. However, the Japanese were already in a state of defeat by that time, and the ships were not used as carriers until the end of the war. With the deployment of the 7,000 t Shinshū Maru and a further refinement, the 10,000 t Type A and Type C, the Japanese amphibious forces had in hand prototypes for all-purpose amphibious warfare ships. Today the U.S. Navy and Marines use this fundamental concept in their LHA and LHD class amphibious assault carriers.

In 1937, British and American observers watched Shinshū Maru at work off Shanghai and immediately recognized a significant development in amphibious warfare. Shinshū Maru carried landing craft in a well deck that could be flooded, which allowed the landing craft to float free from an open stern gate. The ship could also hold additional craft on davits. Her next most impressive function was an ability to discharge vehicles from a deck-level parking garage directly onto a pier. The ship carried two catapults for aircraft, but did not embark operational seaplanes. She could transport and unload aircraft, if necessary, a capability further developed with Akitsu Maru, which had a short take-off flight deck.

=== Post-World War II ===
Despite all the progress that was seen during World War II, there were still fundamental limitations in the types of coastlines that were suitable for assault. Beaches had to be relatively free of obstacles, and have the right tidal conditions and the correct slope. The development of the helicopter fundamentally changed the equation. In 1956, helicopters were first used in an amphibious assault during the invasion of Egypt in the Suez War. In this engagement, two British light fleet carriers, Ocean and Theseus, were converted to perform a battalion-size airborne assault with helicopters.

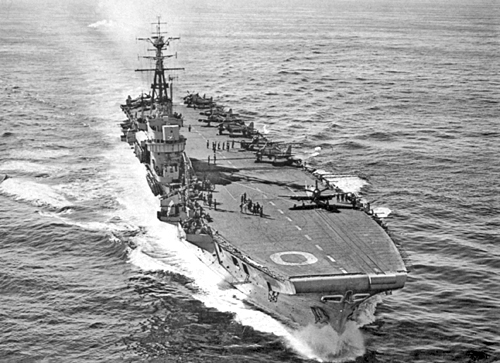
HMS Ocean, a light aircraft carrier seen in 1952, before its conversion into the role of an amphibious assault ship carrying helicopters

The techniques were developed further by American forces during the Vietnam War and refined during training exercises. The modern amphibious assault can take place at virtually any point of the coast, making defending against them extremely difficult.

Most early amphibious assault ships were converted from small aircraft carriers. As well as the two Colossus-class light aircraft carriers converted for use in the Suez War, the Royal Navy converted the Centaur-class carriers Albion and Bulwark into "commando carriers" in the 1950s. Their sister ship HMS Hermes was converted to a commando carrier in the early 1970s, but was restored to aircraft carrier operations before the end of the 1970s.

In the early 1950s, the United States Navy and Marine Corps tested the concept of airborne amphibious operations from aircraft carriers. In 1955, the Casablanca-class escort carrier USS Thetis Bay was converted to an assault helicopter carrier (CVHA-1), ultimately re-designated LPH-6 in 1959. Thetis Bay did not fully meet the Marine Corps requirements, so three Essex-class aircraft carriers, Boxer, Princeton, and Valley Forge, which had greater aircraft capacity, longer range, and higher speed were converted to helicopter carriers as LPH-4, LPH-5, and LPH-8 between 1959 and 1961. They are sometimes referred to as the Boxer class after the lead ship in the series. These provided a valuable interim capability during the construction from 1959 to 1970 of the full complement of seven new Iwo Jima-class ships designed specifically for the landing platform helicopter role.

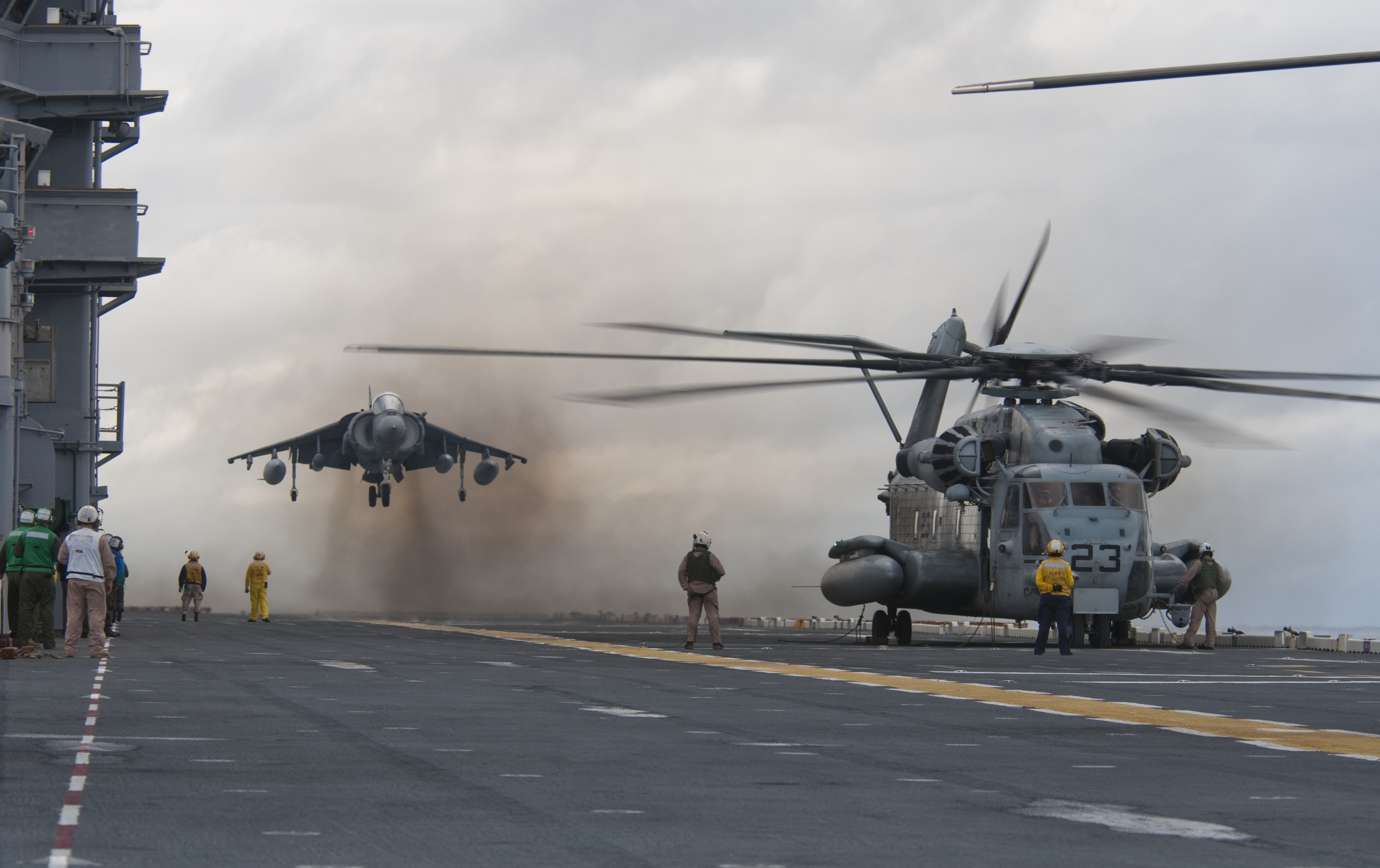
An AV-8 Harrier and CH-53 aboard USS Nassau

Later amphibious assault craft were constructed for the role. The United States Navy constructed the Tarawa class of five landing helicopter assault ships, which began to enter service from the late 1970s, and the Wasp class of eight landing helicopter dock ships, the first of which was commissioned in 1989. The United States Navy has designed a new class of assault ships: the first America-class ship entered service in October 2014.

The first British ship to be constructed specifically for the amphibious assault role was HMS Ocean, which was commissioned into the Royal Navy in 1998. Other nations have built amphibious assault ships. The French Mistral class, South Korea's ROKS Dokdo, and Spain's Juan Carlos I are all currently active. Australia and Turkey have two Canberra-class and one Anadulu-class ships respectively, all based on the Spanish design.

Most modern amphibious assault ships have a well deck (docking well), allowing them to launch landing craft in rougher seas than a ship that has to use cranes or a stern ramp. The US Navy hull classification symbols differ among these vessels, depending on, among other things, their facilities for aircraft: a modern landing ship dock (LSD) has a helicopter deck, a landing platform dock (LPD) also has a hangar, and a landing helicopter dock (LHD) or landing helicopter assault (LHA) has a full-length flight deck with internal aviation facilities for both rotary and fixed wing craft below deck.

== Design ==
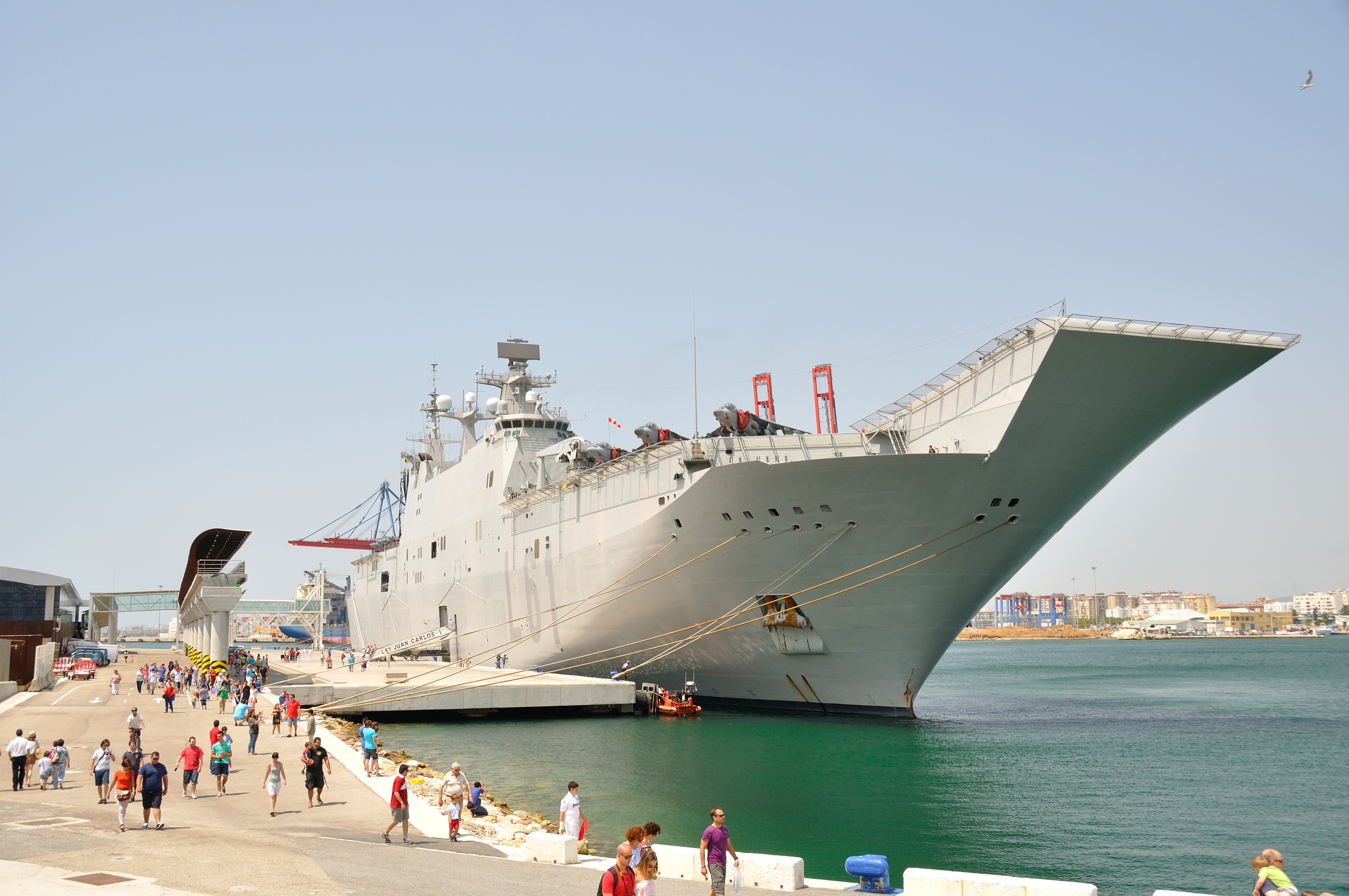
Juan Carlos I of the Spanish Navy with McDonnell Douglas AV-8B Harrier II attack aircraft

Due to their aircraft carrier heritage, all amphibious assault ships resemble aircraft carriers in design. The flight deck is used to operate attack and utility helicopters for landing troops and supplies and on some ship types also launch and recover fixed wing aircraft such as V/STOL Harrier "jump jet"s or F-35Bs to provide air support to landing operations.

STOL aircraft such as the North American Rockwell OV-10 Bronco were sometimes deployed on large-deck amphibious assault ships and were able to perform short take-offs and landings without needing catapults or arresting wires, although for safety and clearance reasons landings were most often not permitted. Landing craft are also carried, either on deck-mounted davits, or in an internal well dock (USN: "well deck").

== List of types ==
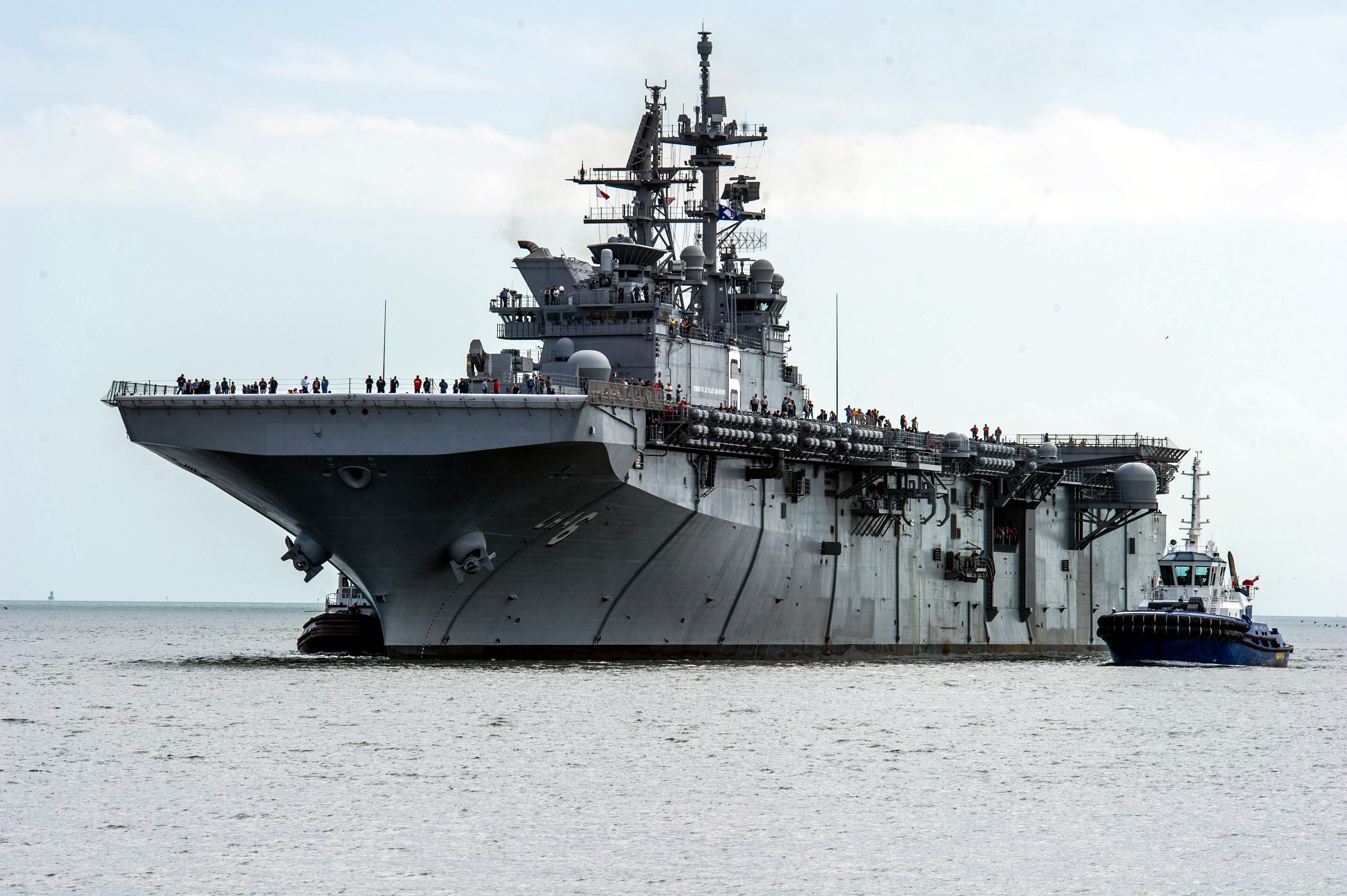
An example of a LHA: America class

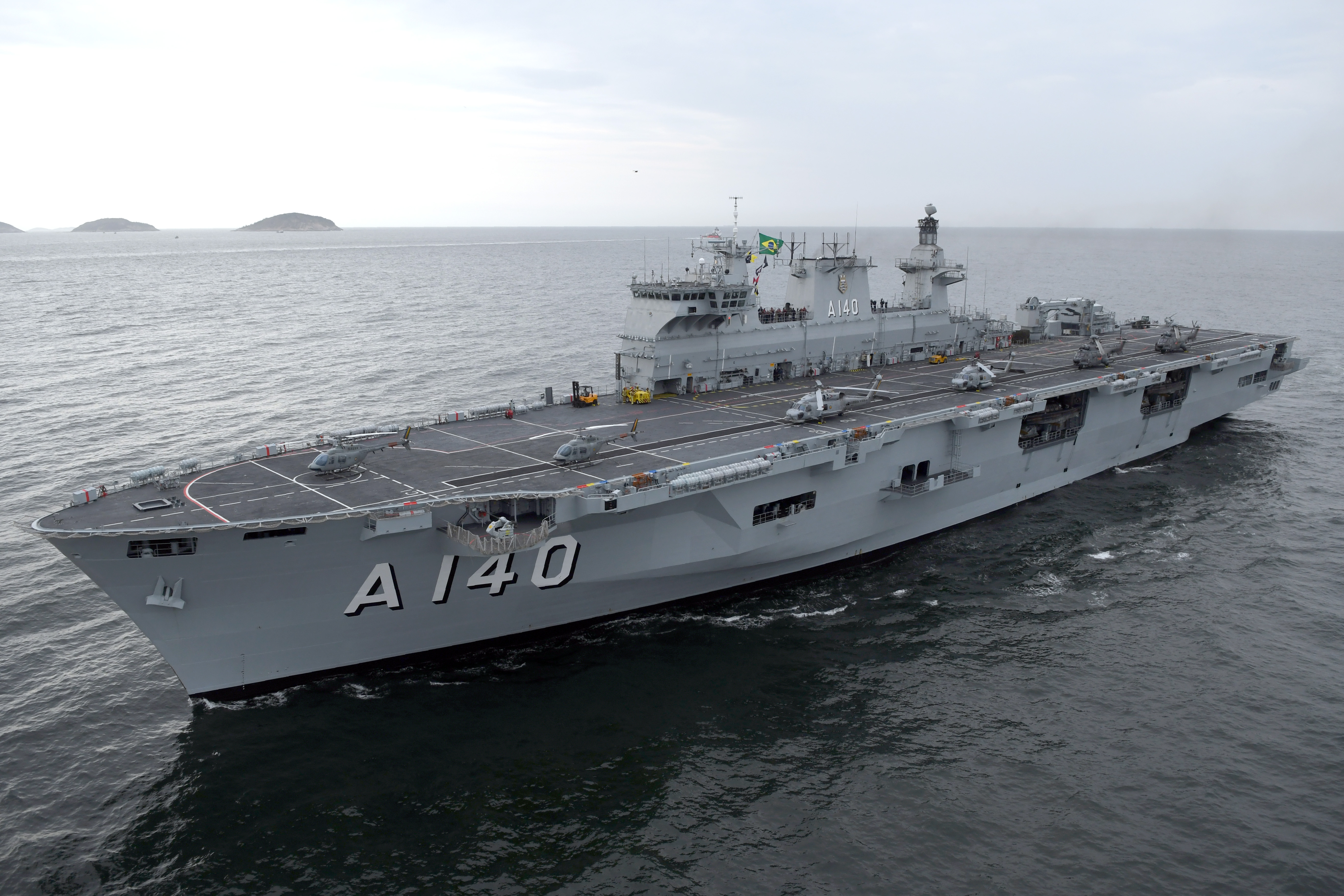
An example of a LPH: Atlântico

- Commando carrier
  - Centaur-class aircraft carrier (UK) – retired
  - HMS Hermes (UK) – restored to full carrier, in service with the Indian Navy from 1986 as INS Viraat until 2017
- Landing craft carrier
  - Shinshū Maru (Japan) - sunk
  - Type A Special Purpose Ships (Japan) - sunk
  - M Type A Special Purpose Ships (Japan) - sunk/retired
  - Type B Special Purpose Ships (Japan) - sunk
  - Type C Special Purpose Ships (Japan) - sunk
  - M Type C Special Purpose Ships (Japan) - retired
- Landing platform helicopter (LPH)
  - Dokdo class (South Korea)
  - Atlântico (Brazil), formerly HMS Ocean
  - Iwo Jima class (United States) – retired
- Landing helicopter assault (LHA)
  - Tarawa class (United States) – retired
  - America class (United States)
  - Type 076 (China)
- Landing helicopter dock (LHD)
  - Wasp class (United States)
  - Mistral class (France and Egypt)
  - Juan Carlos I (Spain)
  - Canberra class (Australia)
  - TCG Anadolu (Note: TCG Anadolu is a drone-carrying amphibious assault ship.) (Turkey)
  - Type 075 (China)
  - Trieste (Italy)
  - Project 23900 (Russia) – under construction

== See also ==
- Amphibious Assault Ship Project
- Amphibious assault submarine – theoretical type
- Aviation-capable naval vessels
- List of amphibious warfare ships
- Mobile offshore base
