= Well dock =

Deck of amphibious warfare ships

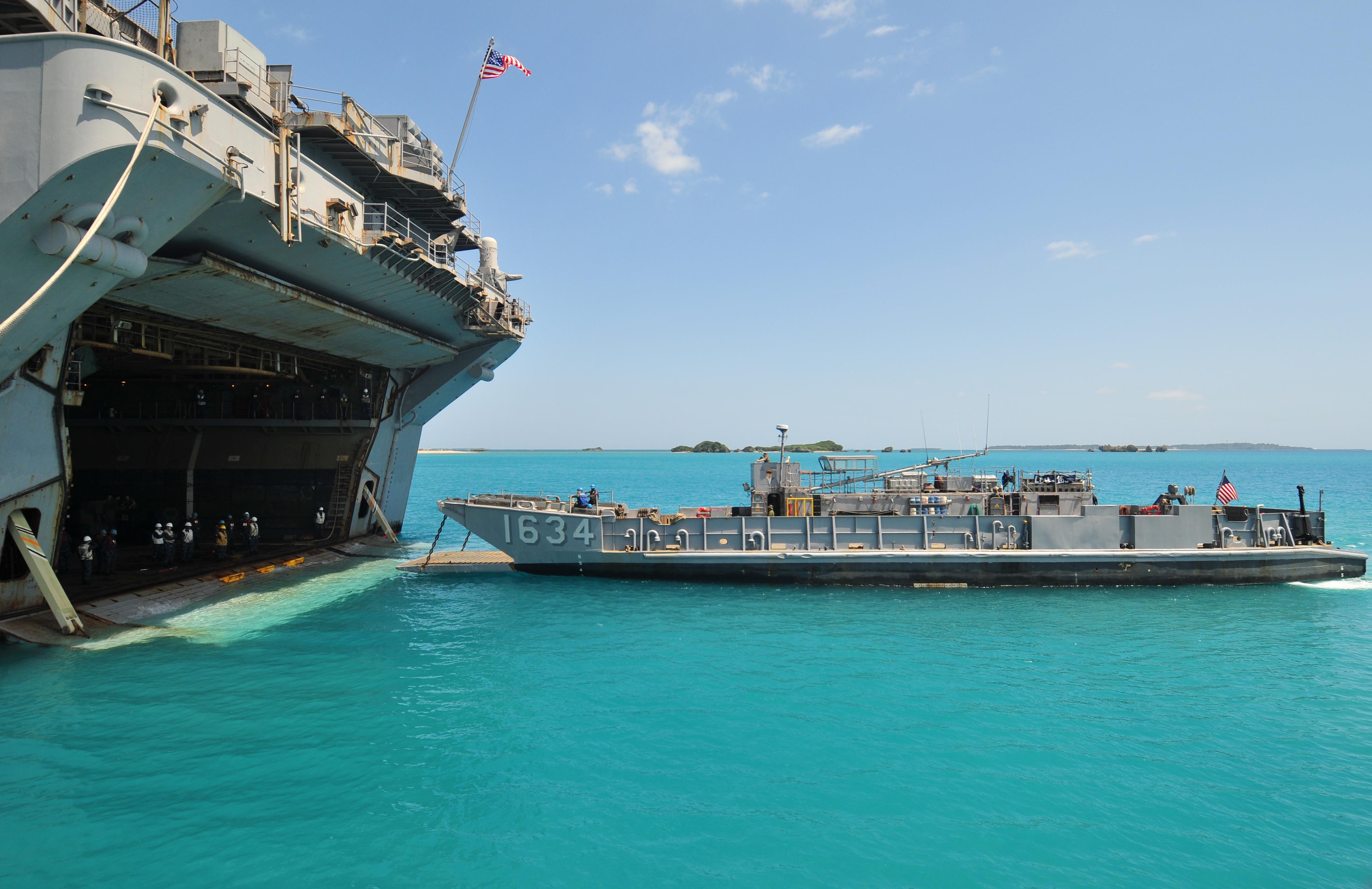
An LCU approaches the well deck of USS Essex.

In modern amphibious warfare usage, a well dock or well deck, officially termed a wet well during U.S. Navy instruction when the well deck is flooded for operations, is a hangar-like deck located at the waterline in the stern of some amphibious warfare ships. By taking on water the ship can lower her stern, flooding the well deck and allowing vessels such as boats and landing craft, amphibious vehicles, and recovered spacecraft crew capsules to dock within the ship.

== Evolution of structure and term ==
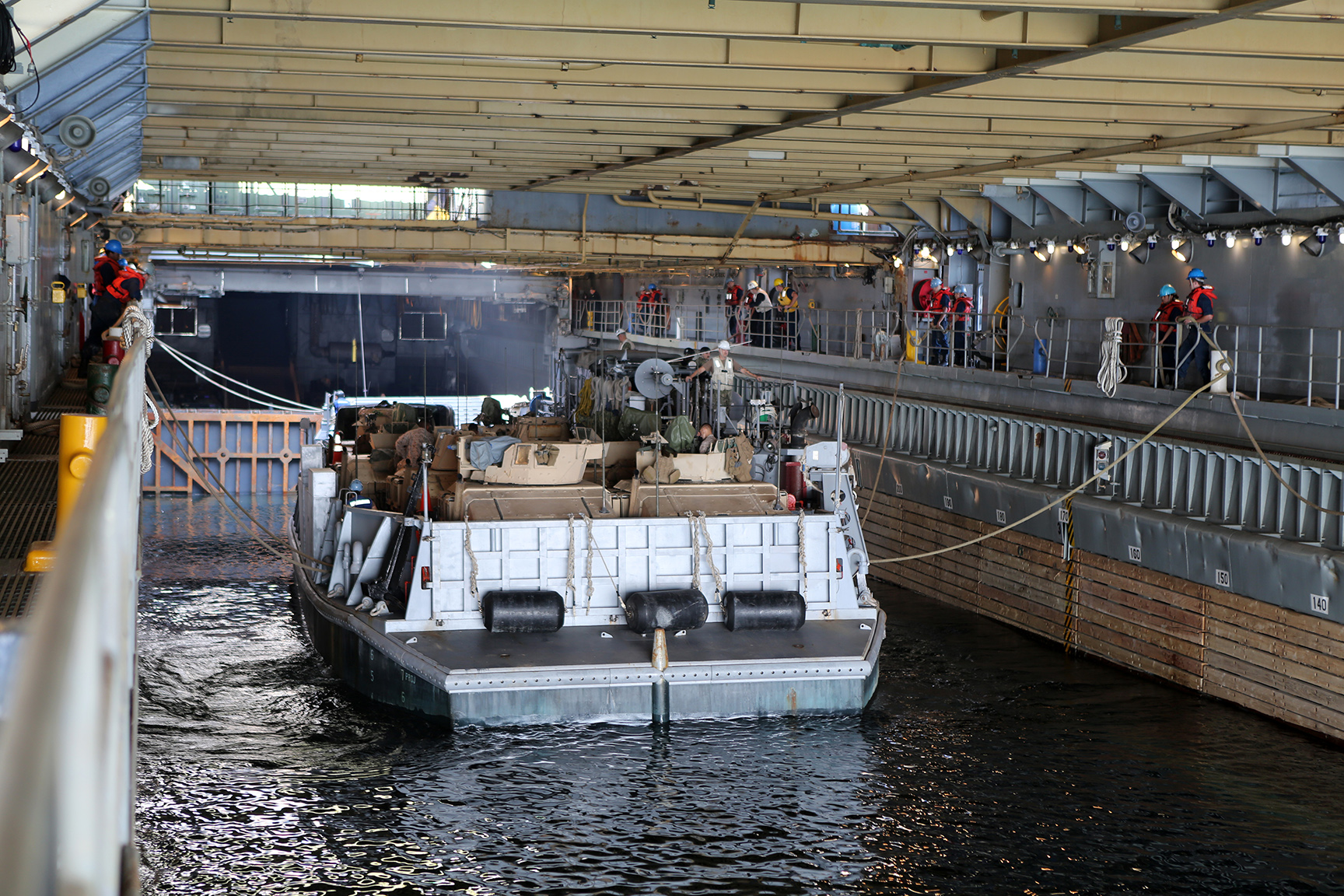
A landing craft in the flooded well deck of USS Comstock

The structure on the modern naval amphibious ships does not exactly fit the traditional "well deck" definition of a weather, or open deck, that is lower than adjacent decks, surrounded by bulkheads that would, lacking proper drainage, form a catchment for water; however, the structure has its origins in such an exaggerated deep deck on World War II-era tank landing craft (TLC) the British forces were considering. On July 19, 1941, Major R. E. Holloway, Royal Engineers, forwarded a design from a 1924 patent by Otto Popper of the Danube International Commission concerning a barge transporter for Danube barges. That evolved into the British TLC-C that would become the Dock Landing Ship (LSD) that had an open, very deep and special-purpose well deck open to the elements and thus technically a "well deck" in the traditional definition.

The open well deck began to see covering in part with platforms, particularly helicopter landing platforms, and in most modern form is no longer a weather deck, being completely enclosed overhead. The structure is seen in ships with a substantial air assault role such as the USS Tarawa.

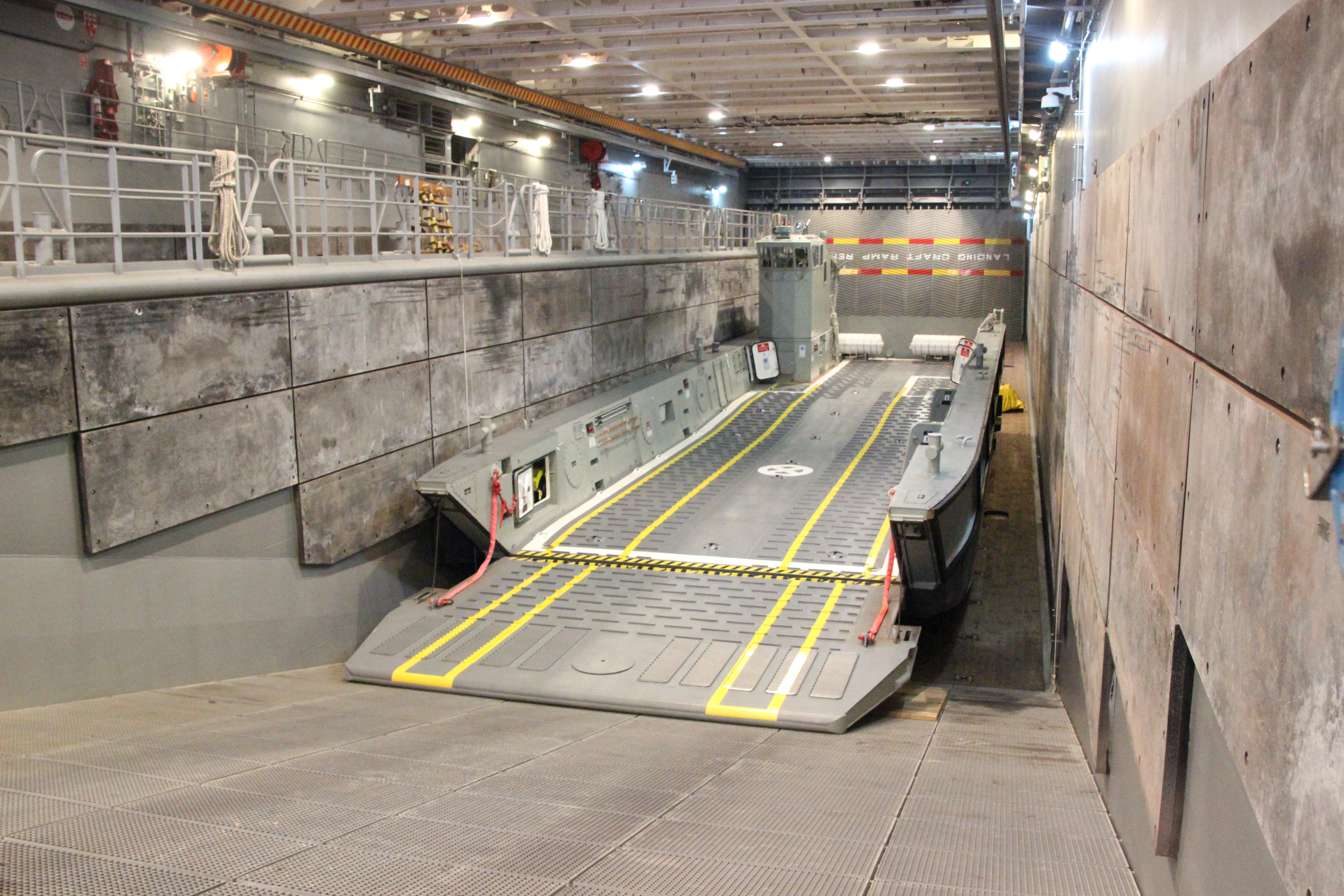
A landing craft in the well dock of HMAS Canberra

The term "well deck" is still used for the newer structure in the U.S. Navy, while other naval usage appears to be more commonly "well dock" that more clearly separates traditional usage from modern naval function.

== Non-military application ==
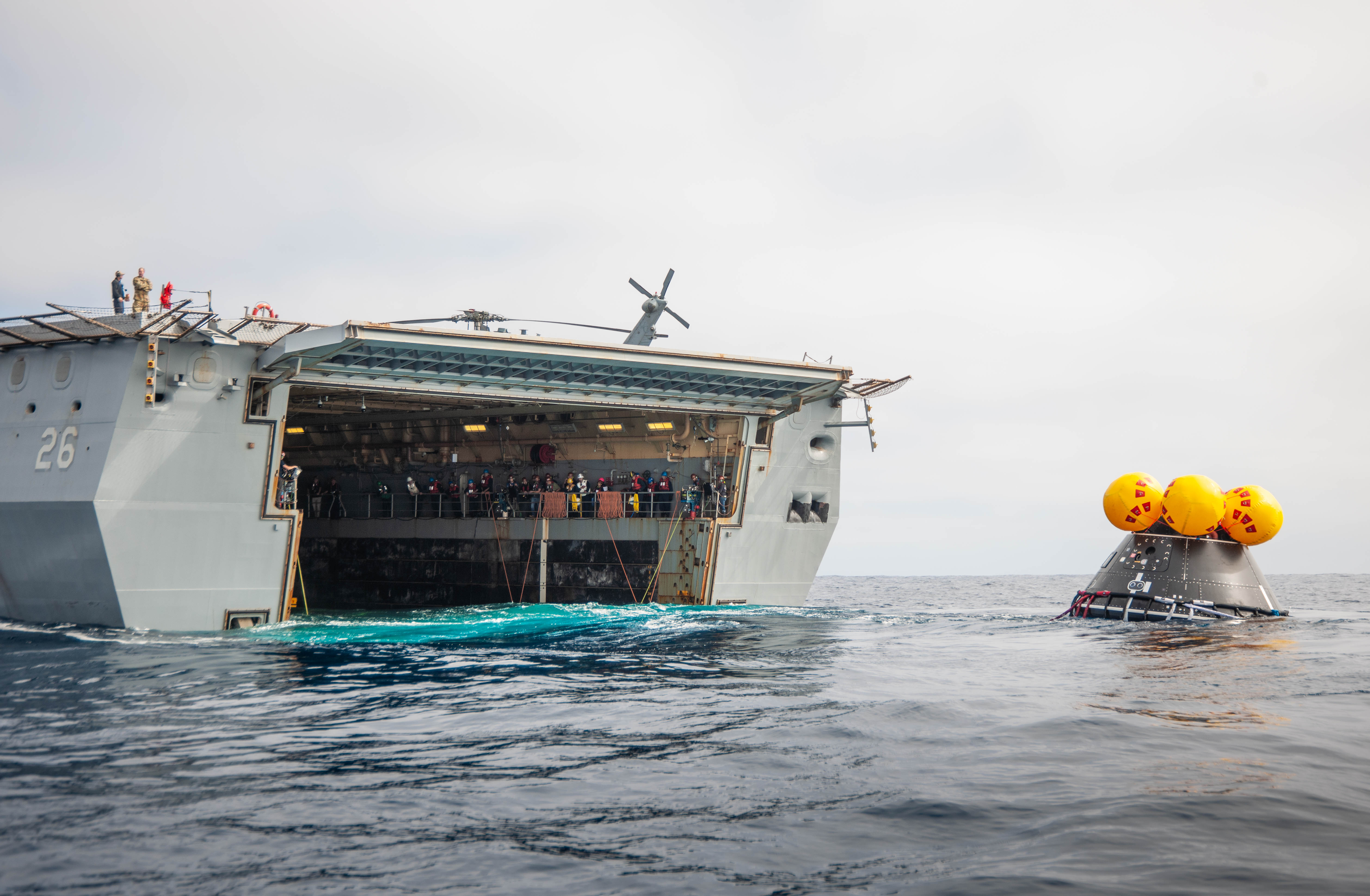
Artemis II Orion capsule Underway Recovery Test 10 (URT-10)

Some commercial vessels have similar structures for purposes similar to the military versions. The German Baco Liner ships use bow doors. Previous barge carriers were of similar design to the military ships with a large stern well deck. The increased use of containers and container port facilities has decreased the use of this type of commercial vessel, with their main use serving regions with less well developed ports.

During the testing program for NASA's Orion spacecraft, in 2013 and 2014 USS Arlington and USS Anchorage used their well decks to recover Orion capsules after splashdown. Earlier capsules such as Gemini and Apollo had to be lifted aboard their recovery vessels by crane.

USS Portland was assigned as the recovery ship for the Orion capsule of the Artemis 1 uncrewed Moon-orbiting mission, successfully completed on 11 December 2022. The spacecraft's Orion capsule was floated into the flooded well deck at the stern of the vessel off the coast of Baja California.

== See also ==
- Wasp-class amphibious assault ship
