= Ship's company =

Crew of a naval vessel

A ship's company or complement comprises all officers, non-commissioned officers and enlisted personnel aboard a naval vessel, excluding civilians and guests. Traditional nautical usage strongly distinguishes officers from crew, though the two groups combined form the complement. Members of a crew are often referred to by the titles crewmate, crewman or crew-member.

== United States ==
=== Aircraft-capable ships ===
An exception to this rule is the definition of ship's company as it applies to the U.S. Navy and U.S. Marine Corps personnel assigned to aircraft-capable ships of the U.S. Navy, primarily aircraft carriers and amphibious assault ships.

In the case of aircraft carriers in the U.S. Navy, the total ship's complement is divided into three categories:

1. the ship's company physically assigned to the ship, and
2. the carrier air wing, with its associated strike fighter, U.S. Marine fighter/attack, electronic attack, airborne early warning and helicopter squadrons, and a detachment of a fleet logistics squadron, which is considered a separate "embarked" command, and
3. the carrier strike group commander and staff, which is also considered an "embarked" command

The number of personnel assigned to the ship's company of a Nimitz-class aircraft carrier averages 3,200 officers and enlisted, while the associated carrier air wing has approximately 2,500 officers and enlisted personnel, and the embarked carrier strike group staff will average 25 to 30 officers and enlisted personnel.

By law, the commanding officer (CO) of a U.S. Navy aircraft carrier must be either a naval aviator or a naval flight officer in the rank of captain. The carrier's executive officer (XO) will also hold identical rank and aeronautical qualifications. Likewise, the commander of the Carrier Air Wing (known by the nickname of "CAG") will also be a naval aviator or a naval flight officer in the rank of captain, although the position of CAG could also be held by a Marine Corps naval aviator or naval flight officer in the rank of colonel. Similarly, the deputy carrier air wing commander (known as the "DCAG") will also hold the same rank and qualifications.

Both the CO of the aircraft carrier and the CAG report to the embarked rear admiral who is the carrier strike group commander.

=== Amphibious assault ships ===
In the case of amphibious assault ships of the U.S. Navy, the total ship's complement is also divided into several categories:

1. the ship's company physically assigned to the ship
2. the embarked Marine Expeditionary Unit (MEU), commanded by a Marine Corps colonel, and consisting of a Marine Corps MEU Headquarters Group (MEU HQG) as the command element (CE), a Battalion Landing Team (BLT) as the ground combat element (GCE), a composite Marine Medium Tiltrotor Squadron (Reinforced) (consisting of Marine Corps rotary-wing, tilt rotor and STOVL attack jet aircraft) as the aviation combat element (ACE), and a Combat Logistics Battalion (CLB) as the logistics combat element (LCE).
3. ancillary embarked units, such as a Tactical Air Control Squadron detachment and a Navy Helicopter Sea Combat Squadron detachment
4. an embarked Amphibious Squadron (PHIBRON) commodore and staff, and
5. an embarked amphibious readiness group (PHIBGRU) or expeditionary strike group (ESG) commander, typically a Navy rear admiral (lower half) or a Marine Corps brigadier general, and associated staff.

Commanding officer and executive officer positions aboard large amphibious assault ships are also assigned to captains and alternate between a naval aviator or naval flight officer in one position and a surface warfare officer in the other.

== Command structure ==
The ship's company is usually divided into various companies or departments, the title varying depending on the extant tradition in that nation's naval service (Navy and/or Coast Guard), which are divided into divisions. In overall command of the ship's company is the commanding officer (CO), assisted by the executive officer (XO) who is the second-in-command of the vessel. The CO's representative with the enlisted crew is called the coxswain in some navies, while in the U.S. Navy and U.S. Coast Guard, the position is known as the command master chief petty officer on surface vessels and the chief of the boat (COB) aboard U.S. Navy submarines. The coxswain/command master chief/chief of the boat is the highest-ranking non-commissioned officer serving on the ship.

Depending on the size and type of ship, each company or department has an average of four divisions ranging from 10 people to several hundred. In charge of each division is a division officer, typically assisted by a division chief petty officer and a division leading petty officer, with various enlisted personnel and non-commissioned officers assigned to the division. Divisions may be further sub-divided into sections or work centers.

There are also various structures, or branches, to the ship's company. The executive branch includes the commanding officer and the executive officer, while the other branches vary from ship to ship and service to service.

== See also ==
- Cadets
- Military
- Navy
