= Belleau =

Belleau may refer to:

== People ==
- Anthony Belleau (born 1996), French rugby footballer
- Bernard Belleau (1925–1989), Canadian chemist
- Isidore-Noël Belleau (1848–1936), Canadian politician
- Lesley Belleau, Canadian Anishinaabe writer
- Narcisse-Fortunat Belleau (1808–1894), first Lieutenant Governor of Quebec
- Rémy Belleau (1528–1577), French playwright

== Places ==
France

- Belleau, Aisne
- Belleau, Meurthe-et-Moselle
- Belleau Abbey, in Marne

United Kingdom

- Belleau, Lincolnshire

== See also ==
- Belleau Wood (disambiguation)
