= Admiral Pringle =

Admiral Pringle may refer to:

- Cedric E. Pringle (born c. 1964), U.S. Navy rear admiral
- Joel R. P. Pringle (1873–1932), U.S. Navy vice admiral
- Thomas Pringle (Royal Navy officer) (died 1803), British Royal Navy vice admiral
