= Joseph V. Medina =

United States Marine Corps general

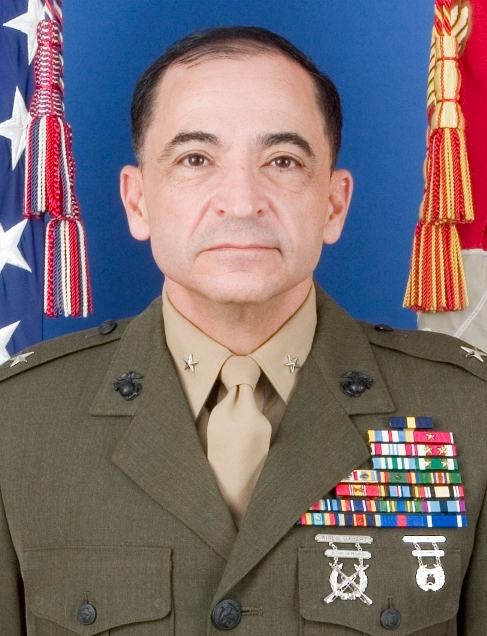
- Brigadier General Joseph V. Medina; First Marine to command a Navy Flotilla
- Born: 1953 (age 72–73); California, U.S.
- Military career
- Allegiance: United States of America
- Branch: United States Marine Corps
- Service years: 1976–2007
- Rank: Brigadier General
- Commands: 3rd Battalion 2nd Marines; 3rd Marine Regiment; Expeditionary Strike Group Three; MCB Camp Smedley D. Butler; 3d Marine Expeditionary Brigade; 3rd Marine Division
- Conflicts: Kosovo War; Operation Iraqi Freedom
- Awards: Navy Distinguished Service Medal; Defense Superior Service Medal; Legion of Merit; Defense Meritorious Service Medal; Meritorious Service Medal

Joseph V. Medina (born c. 1953) is a retired U.S. Marine Brigadier General whose career has taken him from an initial posting leading a rifle platoon to head of the contingency plans branch overseeing NATO's Kosovo operation. In November 2003, Medina took command of Expeditionary Strike Group Three. This event marked the first time in history that a United States Marine Corps officer took command of a Naval flotilla. In April 2007, BGen Medina took command of the 3rd Marine Division.

== Biography ==
=== Education ===
Medina, who is of Mexican ancestry, attended the United States Naval Academy where he was commissioned a second lieutenant upon his graduation in 1976. His academic accomplishments include a Bachelor of Science (Physics) and a Master of Science (Systems Management) degrees from the University of Southern California.

Medina also attended the Amphibious Warfare School, where he was an honor graduate in 1985, the Marine Corps Command and Staff College (Distinguished Graduate, 1992), and graduated in 1998 from the NATO Defense College.

=== Early assignments ===
Medina's earlier career assignments included the following: Rifle Platoon Commander, 2nd Battalion, 5th Marines; Headquarters Company Commander, 5th Marine Regiment; Company Commander, Company F, 2nd Battalion, 5th Marines; Company Commander, Company F, 2nd Battalion, 4th Marines; Company Commander, Weapons Company, 3rd Battalion, 5th Marines; and commander of two Basic School (TBS) companies and an Officer Candidate School (OCS) company.

=== Commands ===
In May 1995, he assumed command of the 3rd Battalion, 2nd Marines. The battalion was deployed to Guantanamo Bay, Cuba in Support of JTF-160 for Operation SEA SIGNAL in 1995, and to Okinawa, Japan as part of the Unit Deployment Program in 1996, during his tour as battalion commander. In February 1997, he was reassigned as the Executive Officer of the 2nd Marine Regiment.

In February 1998 he was transferred to Headquarters, U.S. European Command where he was assigned as Contingency Plans Branch Chief, J3 Directorate. Medina simultaneously served as Chief, Kosovo Plans Group for Operation Noble Anvil, Operation Allied Force and Operation Joint Guardian from August 1998 until June 1999 as a direct result of the Kosovo Crisis. In June 1999 he was promoted to colonel and assigned as the Chief, Operational Plans Division (J35), Operations Directorate. Following that assignment he commanded Third Marines based in Hawaii.

Among Medina's other commands was the G-3, Enlisted Recruiting Operations & Plans at the Marine Corps Recruiting Command at Quantico, Virginia. He has served as Marine Officer Instructor/Associate Professor of Naval Science at Penn State University.

== Commander of the Belleau Wood Expeditionary Strike Group ==
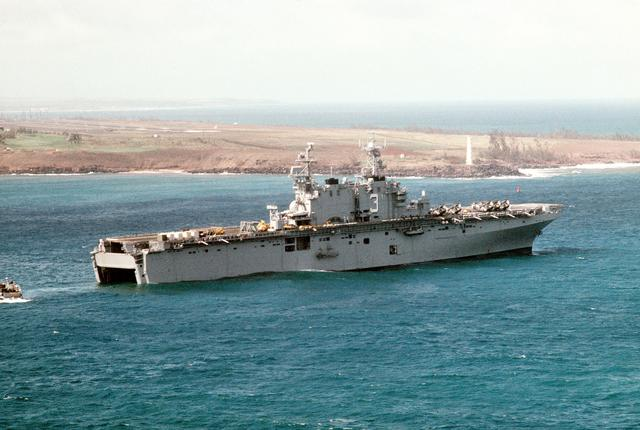
USS Belleau Wood

In 2001, Medina was promoted to Brigadier General and assumed command of the newly established Expeditionary Strike Group Three (ESG-3) in San Diego, California, which is an integral part of United States Navy's Third Fleet. Medina became the first Marine general ever assigned commander of naval ships. On June 10, 2004, Medina oversaw the manning and equipping of ESG-3. From his flagship, the USS Belleau Wood (LHA-3), he led 4,000 Marines and sailors into Pearl Harbor for five days of training. He then led the Belleau Wood Strike Group (BWDESG) through a 6-month deployment in support of Operation Iraqi Freedom where he was assigned as Commander Task Force 58. Their mission was to detect, identify, and disrupt international terrorist organizations and foreign fighters.

== Later years ==
On July 8, 2005, Medina was named Commanding General Marine Corps Base Camp Smedley D. Butler and Deputy Commander, Marine Corps Bases, Japan. On September 6, 2007, Medina handed over responsibilities as commander of Marine Corps Base Camp Butler to BGen Mary Ann Krusa-Dossin.

On April 27, 2007, BGen Mastin M. Robeson passed on the command of the 3rd Marine Division to Medina in a ceremony held at Camp Courtney in Okinawa.

While briefly serving as Commanding General of the 3rd Marine Division, Medina remained dual-hatted as Deputy Commanding General, III Marine Expeditionary Force; and Commanding General, III Marine Expeditionary Brigade. BGen Medina relinquished command of the 3rd Marine Division on June 11, 2007, to Major General Robert B. Neller.

As of May 2007, Medina is one of four Hispanics to hold the rank of Brigadier General and above in the United States Marine Corps. The other three are Major General William D. Catto, Commanding General Marine Corps Systems Command; Brigadier General Angela Salinas, Chief of Staff Marine Corps Recruiting Command and the first Hispanic female to obtain a general rank in the Marines; and Brigadier General David C. Garza, Deputy Commander, Marine Forces Central Command.

Medina who was featured on Hispanic Business magazine in October 2006 as one of the 100 most influential Hispanics in the United States, is an advocate of Hispanic recruitment in the Marine Corps and has been quoted as saying:

"We understand the importance of diversity in the Marine Corps," said the senior ranking Hispanic in the Marine Corps. "That's why the Marine Corps is so strong... we are able to embrace all different elements of society to make the Corps a strong organization."

In the 2024 United States presidential election, Medina endorsed Kamala Harris.

== Awards and decorations ==
Brigadier General Medina's personal decorations include:

1st Row		Navy Distinguished Service Medal		
2nd Row	Defense Superior Service Medal	Legion of Merit w/ 1 award star	Defense Meritorious Service Medal	Meritorious Service Medal w/ 2 award stars
3rd Row	Joint Service Commendation Medal	Navy and Marine Corps Commendation Medal w/ 2 award stars	Joint Meritorious Unit Award w/ 2 oak leaf clusters	Navy Unit Commendation w/ 1 service star
4th Row	Navy Meritorious Unit Commendation w/ 1 service star	National Defense Service Medal w/ 2 service stars	Armed Forces Expeditionary Medal	Iraq Campaign Medal
5th Row	Global War on Terrorism Expeditionary Medal	Global War on Terrorism Service Medal	Korea Defense Service Medal	Humanitarian Service Medal
6th Row	Navy Sea Service Deployment Ribbon w/ 5 service stars	Navy & Marine Corps Overseas Service Ribbon w/ 1 service star	Marine Corps Recruiting Ribbon	NATO Medal for the former Yugoslavia

== See also ==
- Hispanics in the United States Marine Corps
- Hispanics in the United States Naval Academy
