= Belleau Wood =

Belleau Wood may refer to:

- The Battle of Belleau Wood, near Château-Thierry, France, the scene of heavy fighting by U.S. Marines in World War I
- USS Belleau Wood, two United States Navy ships that have been named after the Battle:
  - USS Belleau Wood (CVL-24), a light aircraft carrier (1942–1953), later in the French Navy as the Bois Belleau (1953–1960)
  - USS Belleau Wood (LHA-3), an amphibious assault ship (1978–2006)
- "Belleau Wood", a Christmas song by Garth Brooks from his 1997 album Sevens
