= USS Belleau Wood =

Two ships of the United States Navy have been named Belleau Wood, after the Battle of Belleau Wood near Château-Thierry in France.

- USS Belleau Wood (CVL-24), was a light aircraft carrier converted from a cruiser hull and in service during World War II.
- USS Belleau Wood (LHA-3), was an amphibious assault ship commissioned on 23 December 1978 and decommissioned on 28 October 2005.
