= Expeditionary Strike Group 3 =

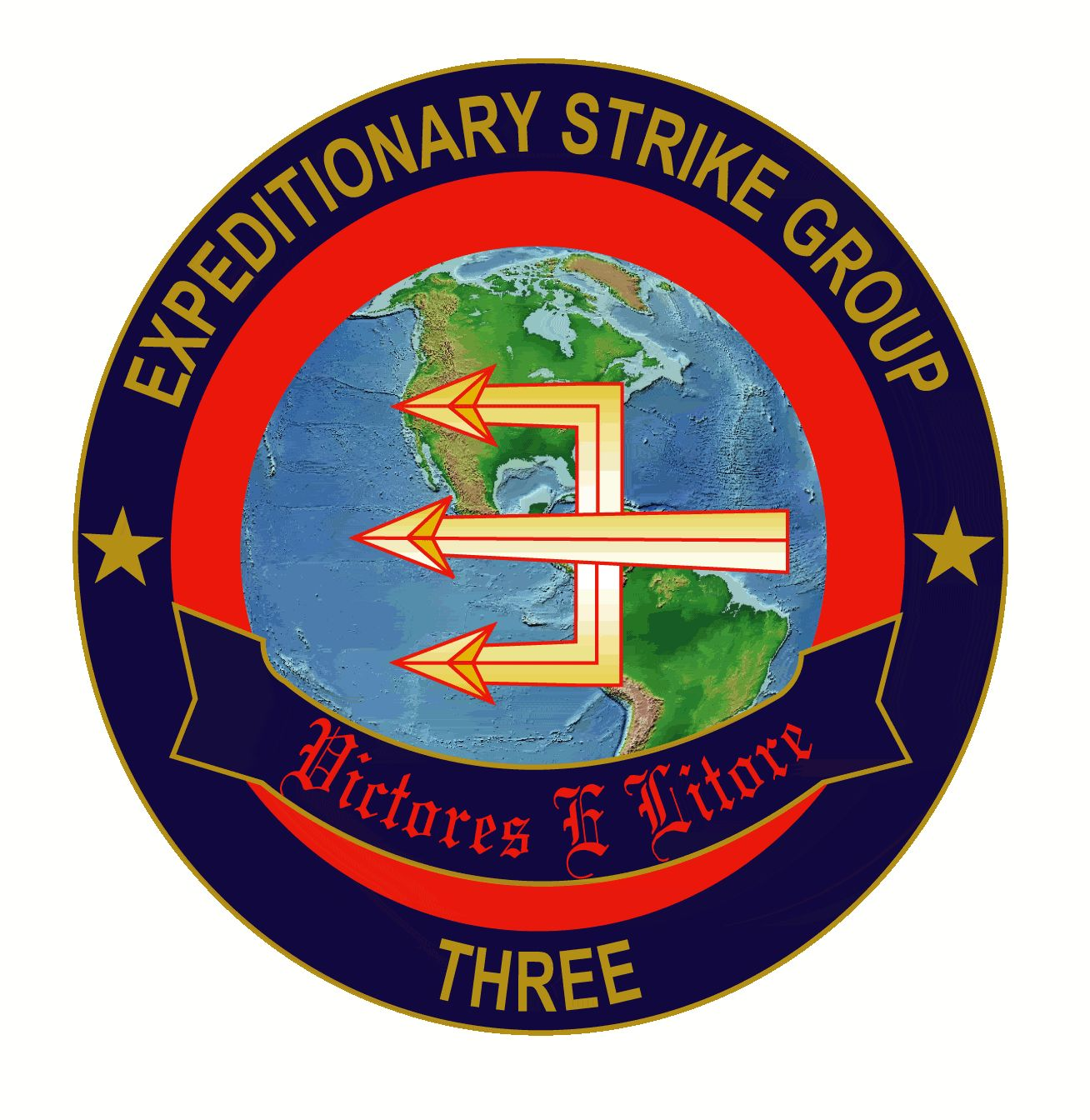
- ESG 3 Logo
- Active: 2007–present
- Country: United States
- Branch: United States Navy
- Role: expeditionary striking power in maritime, littoral, and inland areas in support of U.S. national interests
- Part of: Commander, Naval Surface Forces Pacific
- Garrison/HQ: San Diego, California
- Engagements: As Amphibious Group 3: Operation Desert Shield; Operation Restore Hope; Operation Continue Hope; Operation United Shield; As Expeditionary Strike Group 3: Operation Iraqi Freedom

Commanders
- Current commander: RADM Randall Peck
- Notable commanders: Brigadier General Joseph V. Medina; Rear Admiral Cedric Pringle

Expeditionary Strike Group 3 is an expeditionary strike group (ESG) of the U.S. Navy. Expeditionary strike groups combine the capabilities of surface action groups, submarines, and maritime patrol aircraft with those of Amphibious Ready Groups for deployment and maintaining staff proficiencies to provide fleet commanders with a highly flexible, ready fly-away unit. It is capable of projecting expeditionary striking power in the maritime, littoral, and inland environs in support of U.S. national interests.

The mission of Expeditionary Strike Group 3 is to provide amphibious expertise and a deployable staff for combat and contingency operations in support of the nation's interests and maritime strategy. The staff advocate for the readiness and employment of U.S. amphibious forces across the full spectrum of military operations.

As Amphibious Group 3, the organization participated in Operations Desert Shield, Restore Hope, Continue Hope and United Shield. Upon reorganization and implementation of the newly developed ESG concept in 2003, it participated in Operation Iraqi Freedom.

== Expeditionary Strike Group 3 Subordinate Commands ==
- Commander, Amphibious Squadron 1 (COMPHIBRON 1)
- Commander, Amphibious Squadron 3 (COMPHIBRON 3)
- Commander, Amphibious Squadron 5 (COMPHIBRON 5)
- Commander, Amphibious Squadron 7 (COMPHIBRON 7)
- Commander, Naval Beach Group 1 (COMNAVBEACHGRU 1)
- Commander, Tactical Air Control Group 1

== History ==
Expeditionary Strike Group 3 can trace its origins to Amphibious Group 3 (PHIBGRU 3).

PhibGru 3 was probably active during World War II and was definitely active by 1945; at Eniwetok on 7 September 1945, revised orders directed USS Bayfield (APA-33) to Tacloban in the Philippines, where she arrived on 14 September and reported to Commander Amphibious Group 3 for duty in the occupation of Aomori, Japan. On 17 September Bayfield embarked soldiers and equipment of the U.S. 81st Infantry Division. The landings at Aomori took place according to schedule on 25 September 1945. With the outbreak of the Korean war in June 1950, USS Eldorado (AGC-11) was ordered to the Far East. As flagship for Rear Admiral Lyman A. Thackrey, Commander, Amphibious Group 3, she acted as standby for Mount McKinley (AGC-7) during the invasion of Inchon, Korea, and coordinated and controlled the logistics operations.

In 1978, Amphibious Group Eastern Pacific (PHIBGRUEASTPAC) at San Diego consisted of Amphibious Squadrons 1, 3, 5, and 7, all at San Diego. Early in 1987, the Thirteenth Edition of Ships and Aircraft still listed PhibGruEastPac at San Diego with the same four squadrons, but Amphibious Squadron 7 had moved to Long Beach, Ca. PhibGru 3 was reestablished on 1 October 1984 by redesignating Amphibious Group, Eastern Pacific. On 1 August 1986, COMPHIBGRU 3 was reorganized into three assault squadrons and two non-deploying readiness squadrons.

=== Operation Desert Shield ===
In December 1990, the 13-ship Amphibious Task Force became the largest to sail from the West Coast since 1965 when it set sail in support of Operation Desert Shield. The Task Force reached the north Arabian Sea and was joined by its East Coast counterpart and together they had a total of 31 amphibious ships, four combat logistics ships and eight supporting merchant ships, thus forming the largest Amphibious assault force since the Korean War. COMPHIBGRU 3 participated in what is considered as the major amphibious operation of the Gulf War when in February 1991, together with the 5th Marine Expeditionary Brigade, it landed more than 6,500 United States Marines at Al Mishab, Saudi Arabia, just south of the Kuwait-Iraq border.

COMPHIBGRU 3 was to participate in numerous humanitarian assistance operations after Operation Desert Storm came to an end.

=== Somali Civil War ===
During the Somali Civil War, COMPHIBGRU 3 participated in various operations, Operation Restore Hope, Operation Continue Hope and Operation United Shield. In Operation Restore Hope the force acted as a Maritime Prepositioning Force – based at the Mogadishu Port Facility and in January 1995, the force played the role of Commander, Naval Forces, during the final withdraw of UN forces from Somalia.

=== 1995–2000 ===
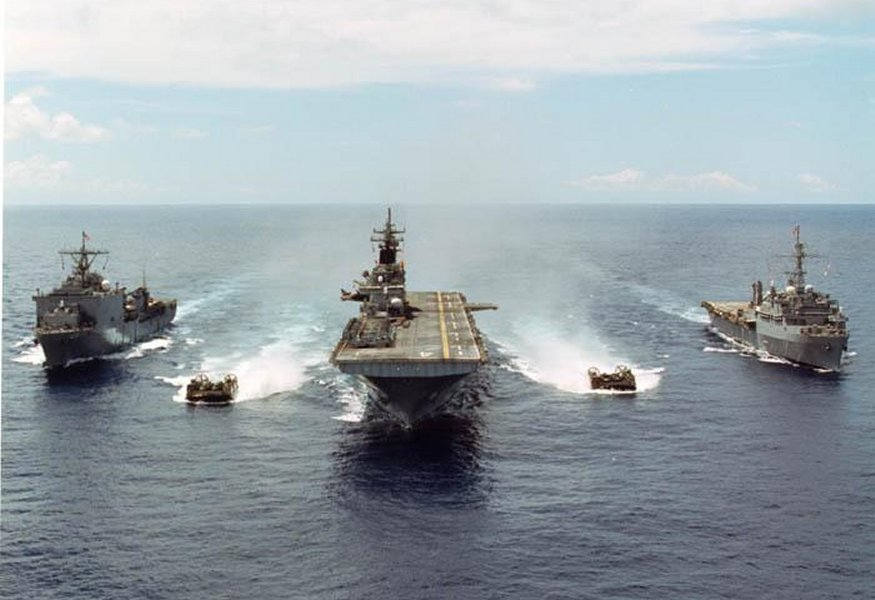
Expeditionary Strike Group 3 Flotilla

From 1995 to 1998 COMPHIBGRU 3 participated in various naval exercises. Amongst them Exercise Cooperation from the Sea (1995) with the Russian Navy, exercises with Jordanian forces (1996) embarking landing craft from the United Arab Emirates for the first time in U.S. Navy history, Exercise Native Fury in Kuwait (1998), Exercise Freedom Banner in Korea (In October 1998, the command absorbed Naval Inshore Undersea Warfare Group 1 and redesignated Naval Coastal Warfare Group 1) and in (2000) Exercise Natural Fire in Mombasa, Kenya.

=== Operation Iraqi Freedom ===
In 2003, COMPHIBGRU 3 provided the forces and stood up as Commander Task Force 51 to execute a multitude of the Naval Component Commander's assigned missions in support of Operation Iraqi Freedom. In addition to the deployments in support of OIF, CPG-3 also deployed the first expeditionary strike group, Expeditionary Strike Group 1, on board USS Peleliu in August 2003. ESG 1 participated directly in Operation Enduring Freedom and Operation Iraqi Freedom. ESG 1 didn't return from the Middle East until March 2004.

In November 2003, Marine Brigadier General Joseph V. Medina took command of Expeditionary Strike Group 3. This event marked the first time in history that a United States Marine Corps officer took command of a naval formation.

In Operation Iraqi Freedom Two (OIF II), included a host of amphibious and maritime ships whose mission was to substitute Marines from the I Marine Expeditionary Force with troops from the United States Army's 1st Infantry. To support the OIF II Force Rotation Plan and the First Marine Expeditionary Force's deployment to relieve the 3d Armored Cavalry Regiment and the 82nd Airborne Division in Iraq, Commander Amphibious Group 3, Rear Adm. W. C. Marsh, and his San Diego–based staff deployed into the Fifth Fleet Area of Operations. Marsh assumed duties as Commander Task Force 51 (CTF 51) and began overseeing amphibious operations in the area.

On 17 April 2007, Amphibious Group 3 was reorganized as Expeditionary Strike Group Three in San Diego. Unlike Commander, Amphibious Group 3, which provided ships with manning, training and material support, ESG 3 was to be strictly operational, preparing ESG forces for deployment and maintaining proficiencies as a staff to provide fleet commanders with a ready fly-away command element that is extremely flexible in mission assignment.
