= Expeditionary strike group =

Organizational unit within the US Navy

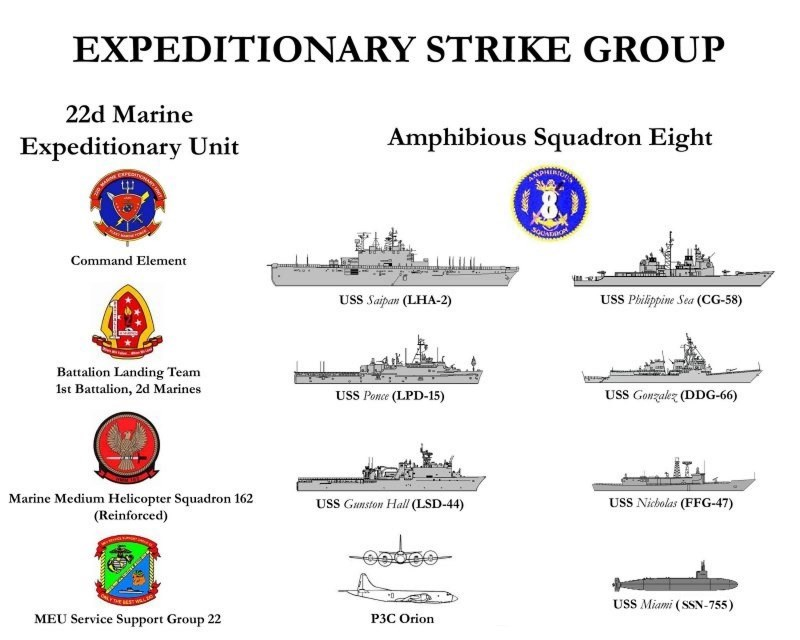
Ships of an Expeditionary Strike Group, circa early 2014

In the United States Navy, the expeditionary strike group (ESG) is a coordinated group of surface ships, aircraft, submarines, and other naval assets. In contrast to carrier strike groups (CSGs), which emphasize air power and are led by a supercarrier, ESGs are strongly suited for amphibious warfare and are led by an amphibious assault ship (currently of the Wasp or America classes). The ESG concept was introduced in the early 1990s, based on the Naval Expeditionary Task Force. The U.S. Navy fields nine expeditionary strike groups.

The ESG concept combines the capabilities of surface action groups, submarines, and maritime patrol aircraft with those of amphibious ready groups (ARGs) and Marine expeditionary units (MEUs) (special operations capable) to provide greater combat capabilities to theater combatant commanders. An expeditionary strike force (ESF) integrates the CSG and ESG with the sea-basing functions provided by the maritime prepositioning force (future) to provide an even more potent capability.

== History ==
The United States Navy has always been involved in moving the U.S. Marine Corps by sea, with and without other naval forces. One of these concepts was the amphibious ready group (ARG). An ARG consists of a group of various ships known as an Amphibious Task Force (ATF), plus a Landing Force (LF), which normally consisted of United States Marine Corps troops, and, on occasion, could consist of United States Army troops.

An ARG is composed of an amphibious assault ship (LHA/LHD), a landing platform/dock (LPD), a Landing Ship, Dock (LSD), and a Marine Expeditionary Unit (MEU), which includes a Marine Infantry battalion landing team, McDonnell Douglas AV-8B Harrier II aircraft, Sikorsky CH-53 Sea Stallion, Boeing Vertol CH-46 Sea Knight, AH-1 Sea Cobra, and UH-1 Huey helicopters.

The Navy had two to three ARGs deployed at a given time. Normally one of the ARGs was in the Mediterranean Sea and Persian Gulf or Indian Ocean area, and the other two were in the western Pacific Ocean.

=== Early 1990s – present ===
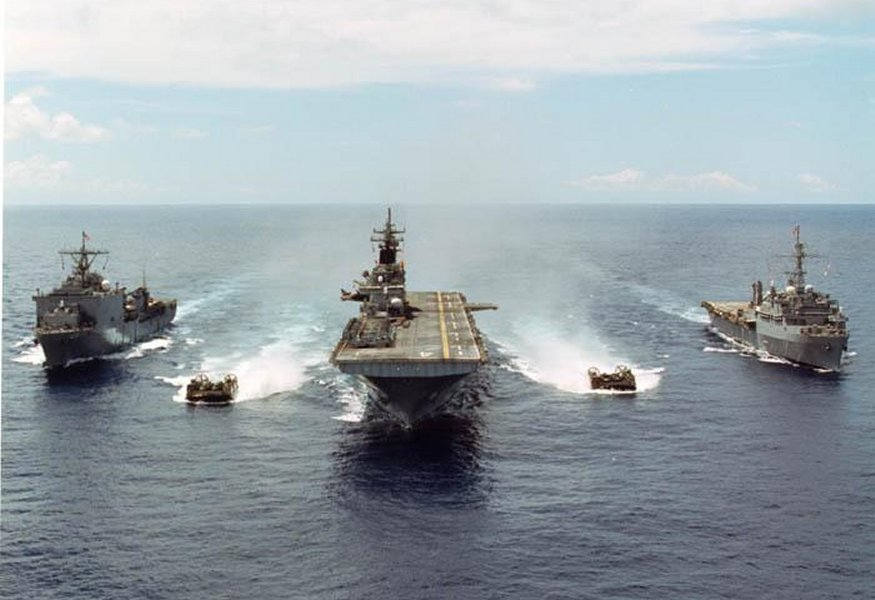
Expeditionary Strike Group 3 Flotilla

In the early 1990s, the U.S. Navy introduced a new concept based on the ARG, the naval expeditionary task force or, as it is also known, the expeditionary strike group (ESG). The ESG is similar to the ARG except that with the ESG concept, the U.S. Navy would be able to deploy almost double the number of independent operational groups, from 19 to 38. In addition, the ESG included surface warships and submarine escorts.

An ESG is composed of an amphibious assault ship (Landing helicopter assault (LHA)/Landing helicopter dock (LHD)), a dock landing ship (LSD), a Landing Platform/Dock (LPD), a Marine expeditionary unit, AV-8B Harrier II aircraft, CH-53E Super Stallion helicopters, CH-46E Sea Knight helicopters or more recently, MV-22B tiltrotors, and other aircraft that comprise a USMC composite squadron. Cruisers, destroyers, and attack submarines may deploy with either an expeditionary strike group or a carrier strike group.

As originally envisioned in the 1990s, the ESG concept allowed the Navy to field 12 expeditionary strike groups and 12 carrier strike groups, in addition to surface action groups centered on Iowa class battleships. Thus, the Navy and Marine Corps forces could launch Marines via landing craft and helicopters as warships and submarines struck inland targets with aircraft, missiles and shells. However, defense budget reductions in the mid-1990s, coupled with retirements of older aircraft carriers and amphibious assault ships without one-for-one replacements, has reduced the original 12 x 12 ESG/CSG construct to fewer groups due to fewer ship hulls to support those said groups.

== Expeditionary strike groups ==
=== Current ESGs ===
The following is a list of U.S. military ESGs:

- Wasp Expeditionary Strike Group – USS Wasp (LHD-1)
- Essex Expeditionary Strike Group - AKA Expeditionary Strike Group 3
- Kearsarge Expeditionary Strike Group – USS Kearsarge (LHD-3)
- Boxer Expeditionary Strike Group – USS Boxer (LHD-4)
- Bataan Expeditionary Strike Group – USS Bataan (LHD-5)
- Iwo Jima Expeditionary Strike Group USS Iwo Jima (LHD-7)
- Makin Island Expeditionary Strike Group – USS Makin Island (LHD-8)
- America Expeditionary Strike Group – USS America (LHA-6)
- Tripoli Expeditionary Strike Group - AKA Expeditionary Strike Group Seven

=== Former ESG units ===
This is a list of former ESGs and similarly themed predecessor organizations:

Named groups
(These were named for the Tarawa-class amphibious assault ships that lead them. All ships in this class have since been decommissioned

- Tarawa Expeditionary Strike Group (before "Tarawa Amphibious Ready Group") — USS Tarawa (LHA-1)
- Saipan Expeditionary Strike Group – USS Saipan (LHA-2)
- Belleau Wood Expeditionary Strike Group – USS Belleau Wood (LHA-3)
- Nassau Expeditionary Strike Group – USS Nassau (LHA-4)
- Peleliu Expeditionary Strike Group – USS Peleliu (LHA-5) - in September 1997, USS Peleliu ARG took part in Fleet Battle Experiment – Bravo's "Silent Fury" phase along with the Constellation Carrier Battle Group. The Peleliu ARG was deployed to the Persian Gulf in 1997 and participated in Exercise Eager Mace 98.
- Bonhomme Richard Expeditionary Strike Group – USS Bonhomme Richard (LHD-6) - a Wasp-class amphibious assault ship ship that was destroyed by a fire while in port.

Numbered groups
(Amphibious Groups since redesignated as Expeditionary Strike Groups)

- Expeditionary Strike Group 1 – Deployed to the Indian Ocean and Persian Gulf in 2003. It included the Los Angeles-class nuclear attack submarine USS Greeneville and the only operational Advanced SEAL Delivery System, a minisub deployed from the Greeneville that was used by Navy SEALs for special operations missions.
- Expeditionary Strike Group 2 – In 1978, Amphibious Group 2 comprised Amphibious Squadron 2, Amphibious Squadron 4, Amphibious Squadron 6, and Amphibious Squadron 8, all at Norfolk, VA. In 1984 it still comprised the same four squadrons, parenting a mix of LHAs, LKAs, LPHs, LPDs, LSDs, and LSTs. The command also included USS Mount Whitney (LCC-20) and USS Coronado (AGF-11). Commander, Amphibious Group 2 was disestablished 31 December 2006, and commissioned as Commander, Expeditionary Strike Group 2, in accordance with orders from the Chief of Naval Operations. This culminated nearly a year of preparation to become an operational command ready to deploy to the Middle East. Commander, Expeditionary Strike Group 2 is an Echelon 4 command, previously reporting to Commander, U.S. Second Fleet. In 1978, USS Francis Marion (LPA-249), a Naval Reserve Force ship, was assigned to Amphibious Group 2.
- Expeditionary Strike Group 3 - ESG 3 can trace its origins to Amphibious Group 3 (PHIBGRU 3), active in WW2. The group went through several iterations, PHIBGRUEASTPAC, COMPHIBGRU 3, Commander Task Force 51, and Amphibious Group 3. The current Expeditionary Strike Group 3 was stood up on 17 April 2007 with RADM Mark Balmert commanding.
- Amphibious Group 4 – USS Panamint (AGC-13), part of the Northern Attack Force, served as flagship of Rear Admiral Lawrence F. Reifsnider, Commander Amphibious Group 4, for the Battle of Okinawa in 1944. In a transfer of flags at San Juan, Puerto Rico, on 23 March 1954, Commander Amphibious Group 4 (COMPHIBGRU 4) shifted his flag to USS Adirondack (AGC-15). Commanded by Rear Admiral Eugene B. Fluckey from November 1960 to October 1961. Active in the 1960s, seemingly up to 1968–69, in the Atlantic Fleet.
- Expeditionary Strike Group Seven - Formed in 1943 as Southwest Pacific Amphibious Force, later called the VII Amphibious Force (VII AF). Its first commander, RADM Daniel E. Barbey, was the author of Fleet Training Publication 167 – Landing Operations Doctrine, United States Navy, and is considered Navy's bible on amphibious warfare. Based in Okinawa, Japan, the Task Force has an illustrious history that continues to this day as the USN's only permanently forward-deployed expeditionary strike group under the U.S. Seventh Fleet.

== Marine air–ground task forces ==
The Marine-air-ground task forces, or MAGTF, are a combined component of air and amphibious ground forces of the United States Marine Corps. They consist of either the Marine Expeditionary Force(MEF), Marine Expeditionary Brigade(MEB), or the smaller Marine Expeditionary Unit(MEU) that deploys either from the United States Navy's Expeditionary Strike Groups or Amphibious ready groups.

The MAGTF are composed of four basic elements:

- Command Element (CE) – Serves as the headquarters for the entire unit and allows a single command to exercise control over all ground, aviation, and combat service support forces.
- Ground Combat Element (GCE) – Provides the MAGTF with its main combat punch. Built around a Marine infantry battalion, the GCE is reinforced with tanks, artillery, amphibious vehicles, engineers, and reconnaissance assets.
- Aviation Combat Element (ACE) – Consists of a composite medium helicopter squadron containing transport helicopters of various models and capabilities, attack helicopters and jets, air defense teams, and all necessary ground support assets.
- Logistics Combat Element (LCE) – Providing the MAGTF with mission-essential support such as medical/dental assistance, motor transport, supply, equipment maintenance, and landing is the mission of the LCE.

The Aviation Command Element now consists of VMM composite squadron. The CH-46 was retired from active service and replaced with the MV-22B aircraft.
