= Villeneuve-la-Lionne =

- Commune
- Location of Villeneuve-la-Lionne
- Location within France Location within Grand Est
- Coordinates: 48°46′12″N 3°27′18″E
- Country: France
- Region: Grand Est
- Department: Marne
- Arrondissement: Épernay
- Canton: Sézanne-Brie et Champagne

Government
  - Mayor (2020–2026): Dominique Jegou
- Area^{1}: 15.27 km^{2} (5.90 sq mi)
- Elevation: 134 m (440 ft)
- Population (2023): 269
  - Density: 17.6/km^{2} (45.6/sq mi)
- Time zone: UTC+01:00 (CET)
  - Summer (DST): UTC+02:00 (CEST)
- INSEE/Postal code: 51625 /51310
- ^{1} French Land Register data, which excludes lakes, ponds, glaciers > 1 km^{2} (0.386 sq mi or 247 acres) and river estuaries.

Villeneuve-la-Lionne (French pronunciation: [vilnœv la ljɔn]) is a commune in the Marne department in north-eastern France.

It is the site of the former Belleau Abbey, now used as a church

== See also ==
- Communes of the Marne department
