= William D. Catto =

United States Marine Corps general

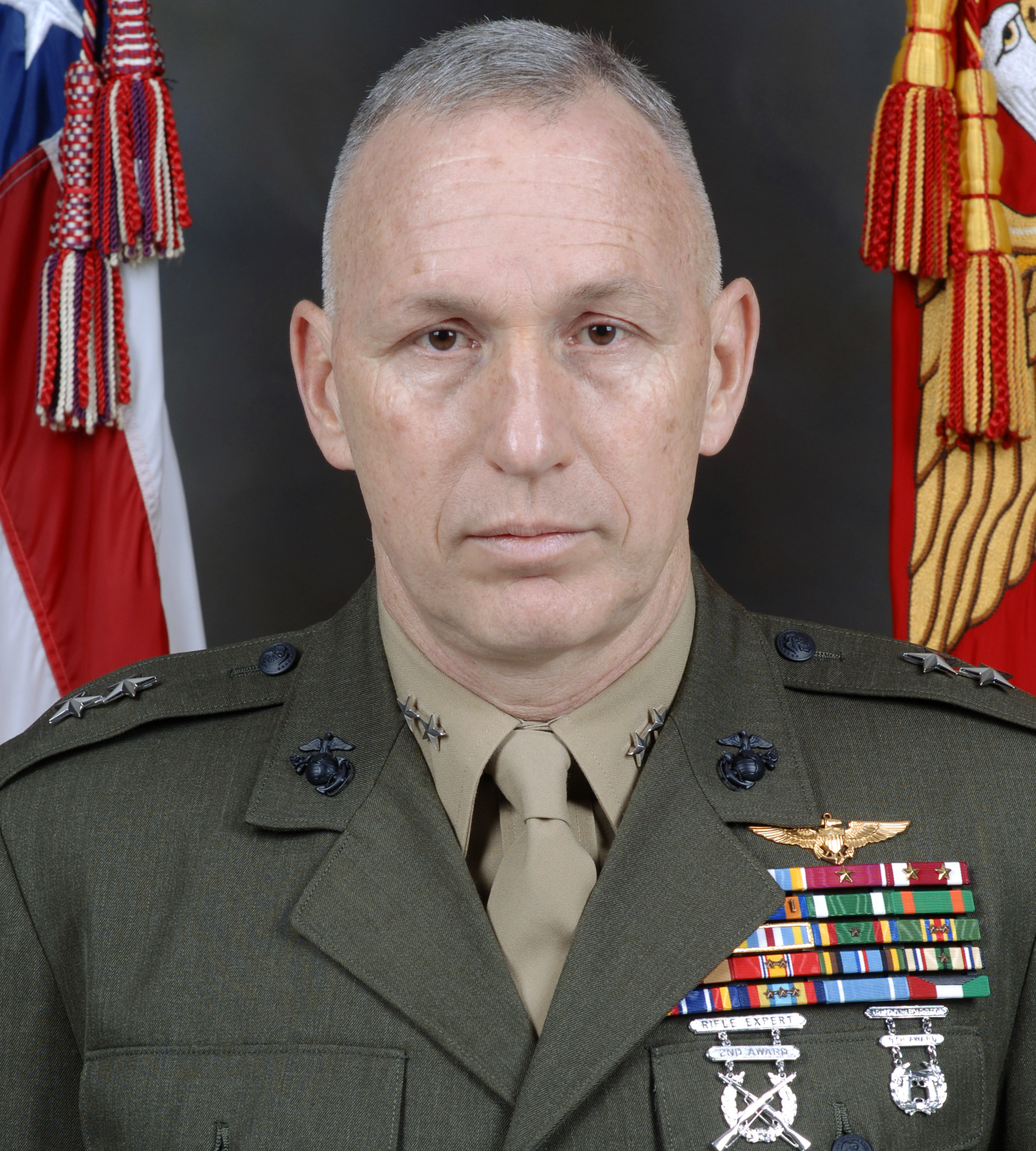
- MajGen William D. Catto
- Military career
- Allegiance: United States of America
- Branch: United States Marine Corps
- Rank: Major General
- Nickname: Bill
- Commands: HMM-163; Marine Corps Warfighting Laboratory; Marine Corps Systems Command
- Awards: Distinguished Service Medal; Defense Superior Service Medal; Legion of Merit (2)

William D. Catto is a United States Marine Corps major general who is the chief of staff of the United States European Command. He assumed the post in July 2006, becoming the first U.S. Marine to hold the role. Catto has served over 10 years in command assignments at the lieutenant colonel, colonel, brigadier general, and major general ranks.

== Biography ==
Catto earned his undergraduate degree from Bethel College and his M.A. from Webster University.

Following qualification to operate the CH-46 Sea Knight helicopter, Catto spent the next thirteen years in operational assignments. In squadrons, he served in the Aircraft Maintenance, Administration, and Operations Departments. He served with 7th Marines as the Air Officer and then Regimental Operations Officer.

Following Command and Staff College, Catto was assigned to Headquarters Marine Corps in Washington, D.C., where he served in Manpower as the Major's Rotary-Wing Assignment Officer and then as the Administrative Assistant to the Deputy Commandant for Aviation.

Returning to the Operating Forces, Catto was assigned to HMM-163 and served as the executive officer and then commanding officer where he deployed twice in MEU (SOC) rotations. Following this tour, he was assigned to the RAND Corporation in Santa Monica, California, as a Marine Corps Fellow. Following this tour he was again ordered to duty in Washington, D.C., with the Office of the Secretary of Defense; Programs, Analysis, and Evaluations; Cost Analysis Improvement Group; Weapons Systems Cost Analysis Division. Catto then went on to command Marine Aviation Weapons and Tactics Squadron One. In flying assignments, he has amassed more than 4,100 flight hours in 13 aircraft types.

From June 2000 to June 2002, Catto served concurrently as commanding general, Marine Corps Warfighting Laboratory, and vice chief of naval research, Office of Naval Research. From July 2002 to June 2006, he assumed duties as the commanding general, Marine Corps Systems Command.

Catto retired from the Marine Corps in late 2008 and then served as a director for Raytheon. He then retired from Raytheon in the spring of 2018.

== Personal ==
In the 2024 United States presidential election, Catto endorsed Kamala Harris.

== Awards ==
Major General Catto's personal awards include:

Naval Aviator Badge
	Navy Distinguished Service Medal	Defense Superior Service Medal	
Legion of Merit w/ 1 award star	Meritorious Service Medal w/ 2 service stars	Air Medal w/ Strike/Flight numeral "1"	Navy and Marine Corps Commendation Medal
Navy and Marine Corps Achievement Medal	Joint Meritorious Unit Award	Navy Unit Commendation w/ 1 service star	Navy Meritorious Unit Commendation w/ 2 service stars
Marine Corps Expeditionary Medal	National Defense Service Medal w/ 2 service stars	Armed Forces Expeditionary Medal	Southwest Asia Service Medal w/ 1 service star
Global War on Terrorism Service Medal	Navy Sea Service Deployment Ribbon w/ 3 service stars	United Nations Medal	Kuwait Liberation Medal (Kuwait)

== See also ==
- Hispanics in the United States Marine Corps
