= Cedric E. Pringle =

US Navy officer (born c. 1964)

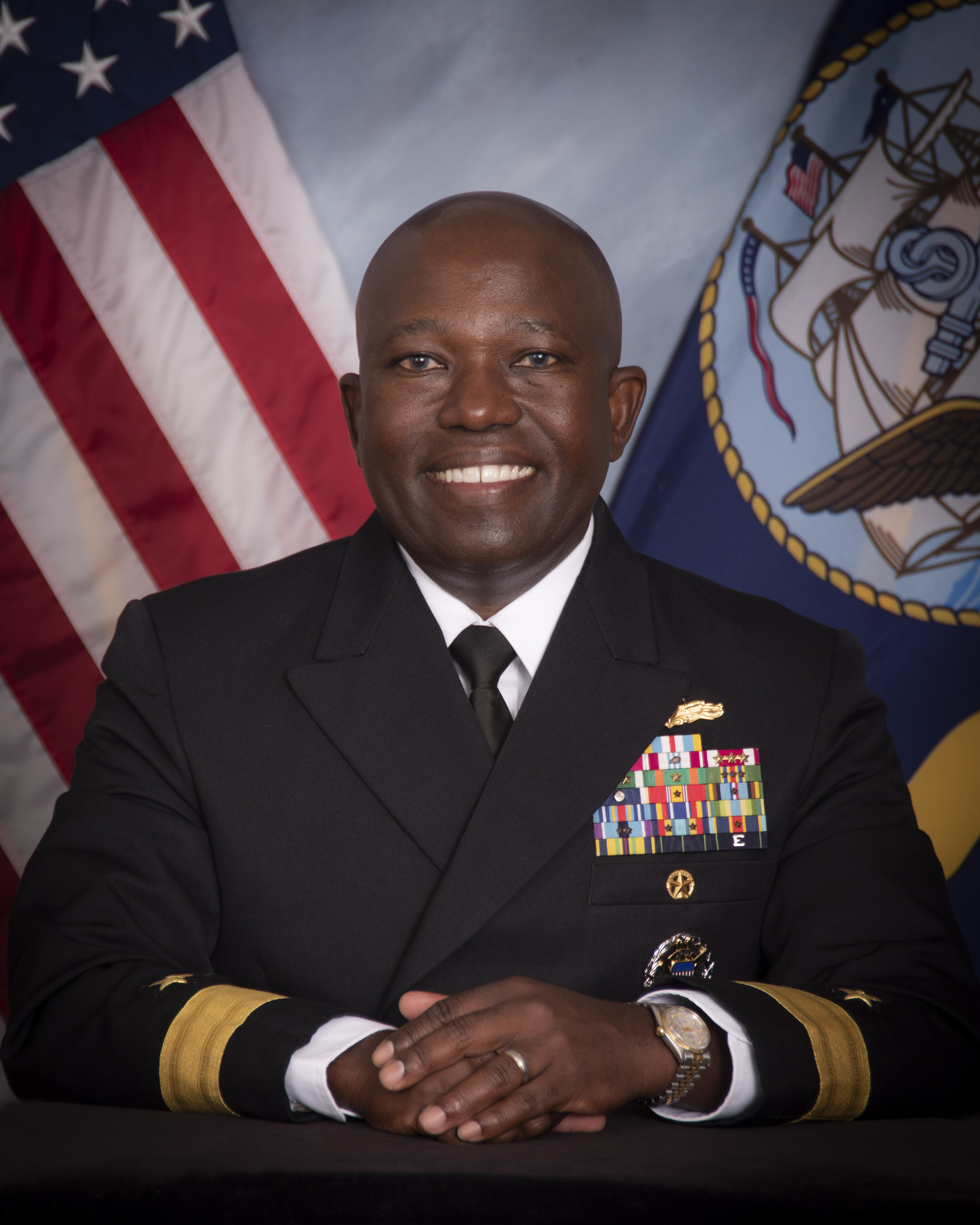
- Pringle in 2020
- Born: c. 1964 (age 61–62)
- Education: University of South Carolina (BS); Naval Postgraduate School (MS); Naval War College (MA)
- Military career
- Allegiance: United States
- Branch: United States Navy
- Service years: 1986-2021
- Rank: Rear admiral (lower half)
- Commands: National War College; Expeditionary Strike Group 3 USS Makin Island (LHD-8); USS Whidbey Island (LSD-41)
- Awards: Defense Superior Service Medal; Legion of Merit; Defense Meritorious Service Medal; Meritorious Service Medal; Navy and Marine Corps Commendation Medal; Navy and Marine Corps Achievement Medal

Cedric E. Pringle (born c. 1964) is a former United States Navy officer and career Surface Warfare Officer who served as the 31st Commandant of the National War College. He served in this position from October 16, 2019 until July 2021, when he relinquished command to Air Force Brigadier General Jeffrey H. Hurlbert. As the commandant, Pringle was responsible for formulating academic policies, supervising curriculum planning, preparation, and ensuring excellence in classroom teaching. Prior to serving as Commandant, Pringle served as Commander, Expeditionary Strike Group 3, from December 2017 to September 2019.

== Early life and education ==
Pringle graduated from the University of South Carolina in December 1986 with a Bachelor of Science in Economics and received his commission through Navy ROTC. He also earned a Master of Science in Financial Management from the Naval Postgraduate School in 1998 and a Master of Arts in National Security Strategy from the Naval War College in 2003.

== Military career ==
At sea, he served in the engineering department onboard USS Ranger (CV-61) and USS Portland (LSD-37) and as executive officer on USS Fort McHenry (LSD-43). In July 2004, he assumed command of USS Whidbey Island (LSD-41). During his tour, he participated in humanitarian assistance and disaster relief operations in response to Hurricane Katrina in September 2005. In February 2012, he took command of the Navy’s first hybrid propulsion drive ship, USS Makin Island (LHD-8). During his tenure, Makin Island completed its maiden deployment and achieved numerous successes, including earning the Battle “E” Award, the Retention Excellence Award, Afloat and Aviation Operational Safety Awards and the President’s Volunteer Service Award for community outreach.

Ashore, he served on various staffs up to and including on the Joint Staff Force Structure, Resources and Assessment Directorate (J8). He also served as director, Navy Senate Liaison for the Secretary of the Navy’s Office of Legislative Affairs. From September 2015 to November 2017, he served as deputy director of Joint Interagency Task Force South. During this tour, he also volunteered to serve as commander, Joint Task Force Matthew, leading relief and recovery efforts in Haiti following Hurricane Matthew in October 2016.

From December 2017 to September 2019, he served as commander, Expeditionary Strike Group 3, the Navy's largest Strike Group that is composed of 15 ships, 31 subordinate commands, and 15,000 Sailors and Marines. During his tenure, ESG3 led the first-ever Arctic Expeditionary Capabilities Exercise as a Littoral Combat Force headquarters, orchestrating simultaneous operations across 2.2 million square miles, ranging from Adak, Alaska to San Diego, California.

Pringle assumed command as the 31st commandant of National War College on 16 October 2019.

Pringle is the recipient of the 2015 Navy’s Stars and Stripes Award.
