= Marine Expeditionary Unit =

Small United States Marine Corps task force

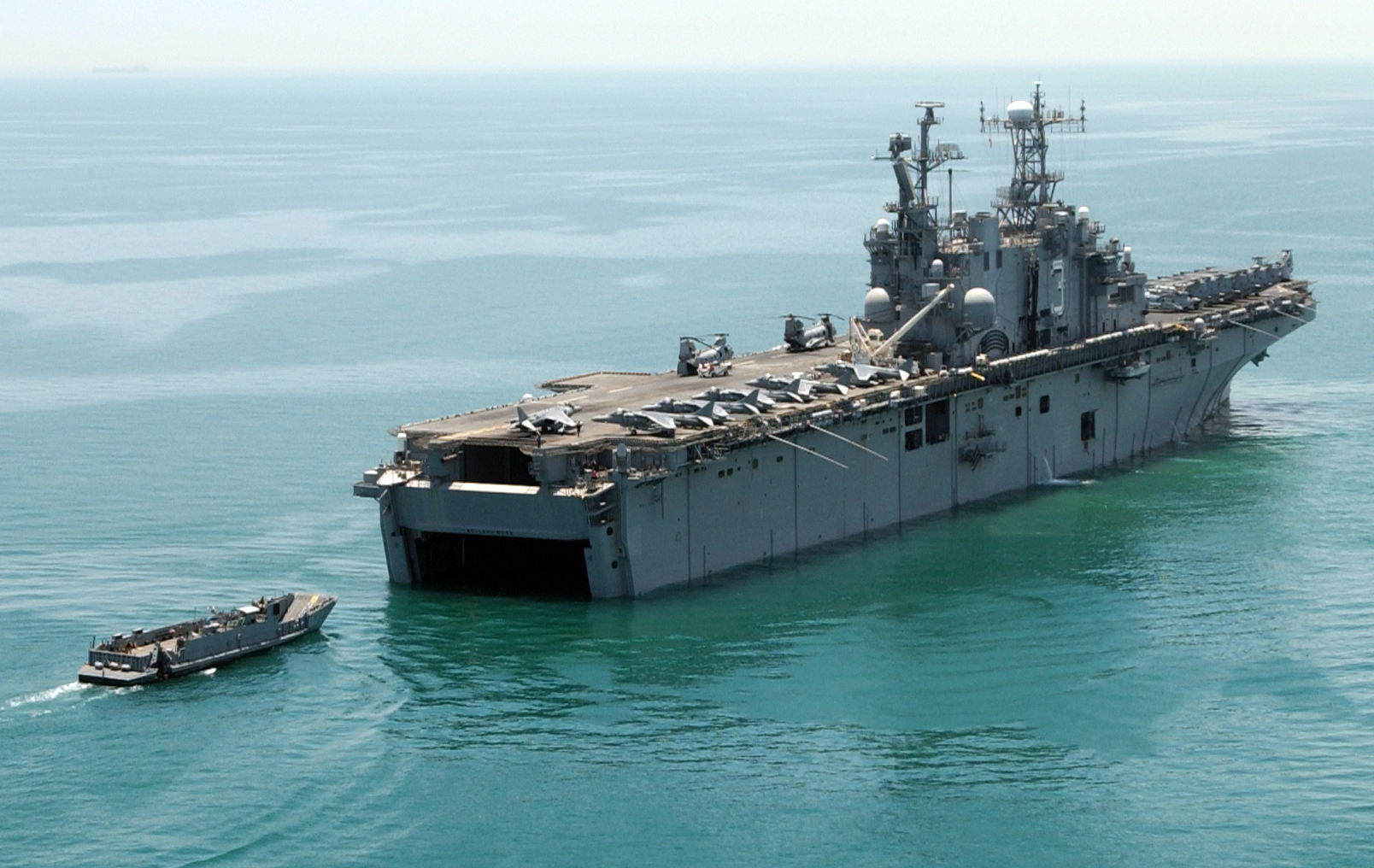
A landing craft utility returns to USS Belleau Wood with members of the 11th Marine Expeditionary Unit

A Marine Expeditionary Unit (MEU, pronounced as one syllable "M'you" IPA: /mjuː/) is the smallest form of Marine Air–Ground Task Force (MAGTF) in the United States Fleet Marine Force. Each MEU is an expeditionary rapid reaction force ready to answer any crisis, whether it be disaster aid or a combat mission. Marine Amphibious Unit (MAU) was the name used until the late 1980s.

A MEU normally is composed of

- a reinforced USMC infantry battalion (designated as a Battalion Landing Team) as the Ground Combat Element
- a composite medium tiltrotor squadron forming the Aviation Combat Element
- a combat logistics battalion providing the Logistics Combat Element
- a company-size Command Element serving as the MEU headquarters group.

Troop strength of a MEU is about 2,200 (normal and peacetime) to 4,400 (mobilization and wartime). A MEU is usually commanded by a colonel, and is deployed from amphibious assault ships. Currently, a MEU embarks personnel and equipment on the amphibious warfare ships of an expeditionary strike group (ESG), which also includes escort warships and submarines to protect them from air, surface, and submarine threats. For further protection and strong air support, an ESG is often deployed along with one or more carrier strike groups.

== Attributes ==
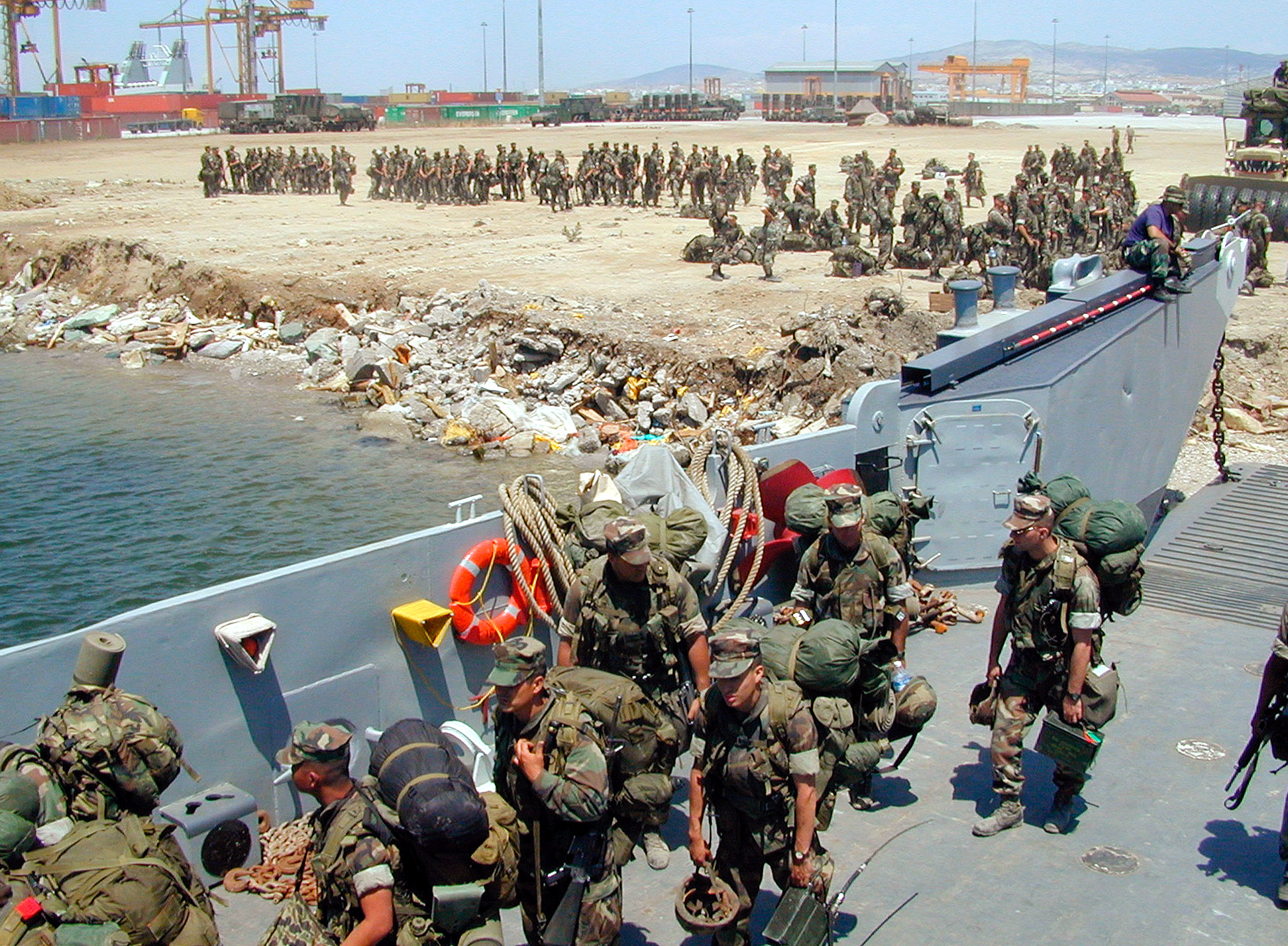
Marines loading on a Landing Craft Utility in 1999

The MEU is unique in that its air and ground combat elements are combined with a logistics combat element under one commander; other services do not unite the command of air and ground forces until much higher command levels.

The MEU's ground combat element also combines artillery, light armor, and tanks at a much lower level than was common in the Army until the development of the Brigade Combat Team early in the war on terror, with a similar concept, the combat command, being utilized in World War II.

The Marine Air–Ground Task Force concept is designed to thoroughly exploit the combat power inherent in air and ground assets by closely integrating them into a single force. The MEU brings all the supplies and logistical support it needs to sustain itself for quick mission accomplishment or to prepare the way for follow-up forces. This self-sustainment allows more flexibility in disposition and operations of forces, and allows the MEU to initiate operations sooner and let support catch up later, without having to wait for external logistical support to begin a mission. Deployments on U.S. Navy amphibious assault ships allows MEUs to seabase around the globe, ready for deployment at short notice.

A typical MEU has approximately 2,200 members, including navy sailors. It is equipped with:

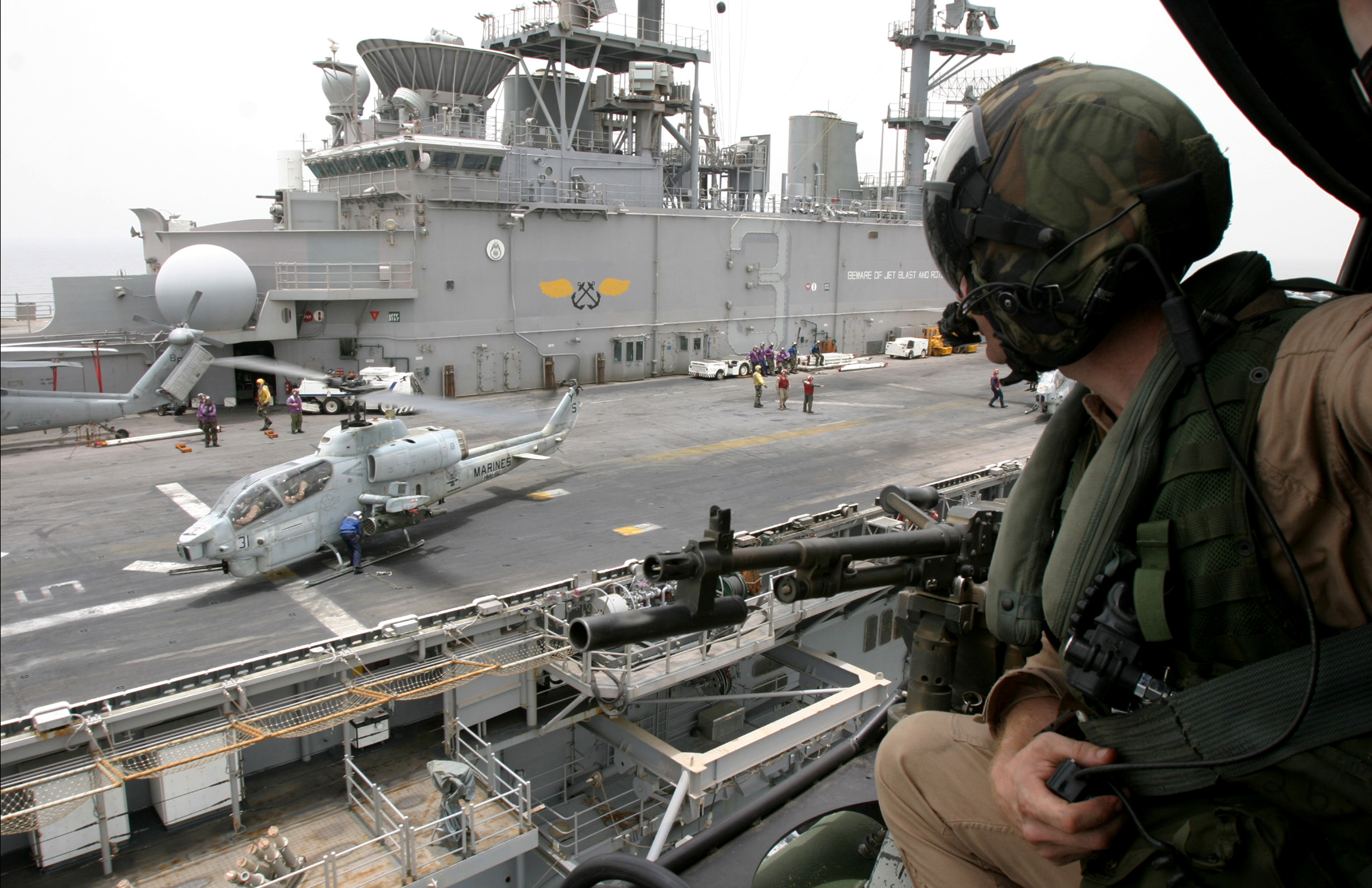
A UH-1N from the 26th Marine Expeditionary Unit flies past an AH-1W on the flight deck of USS Kearsarge

Qty	Nomenclature	Element
7 to 16	Light Armored Vehicle	ground
15	Assault Amphibious Vehicle	ground
6	155mm howitzer: M777	ground
8	M252 81mm mortar	ground
8	BGM-71 Tube-Launched, Optically-Tracked, Wire-Guided (TOW) missile weapon system	ground
8	FGM-148 Javelin anti-tank missile	ground
4 to 6	AH-1Z Viper attack helicopters	aviation
3	UH-1Y Venom light utility helicopters	aviation
12	MV-22A Osprey medium-lift tiltrotor aircraft	aviation
4	CH-53E Super Stallion heavy-lift transport helicopters	aviation
6	AV-8B Harrier V/STOL light-attack airplanes	aviation
2	KC-130 Hercules aerial re-fueler/transport airplanes Note: usually maintained in the contiguous United States	aviation
2	Reverse Osmosis Water Purification Unit	logistics
1	LMT 3000 water purification unit	logistics
4	Tractor, Rubber Tire, Articulated Steering	logistics
2	TX51-19M Rough Terrain Forklift	logistics
3	D7 bulldozer	logistics
1	Medium Tactical Vehicle Replacement dump truck	logistics
4	Mk48 Logistics Vehicle System	logistics
7	500 gallon water containers	multiple
63	Humvee	multiple
30	Medium Tactical Vehicle Replacement trucks	multiple
5	Boeing Insitu RQ-21 Blackjack	aviation

Many types of equipment are, or will soon, undergo a transitory phase as they are replaced. Some examples include the Amphibious Combat Vehicle replacing the AAV-7, the F-35 Lightning II replacing the AV-8B Harrier, and the CH-53K King Stallion replacing the CH-53E.

== Elements ==
=== Ground combat element ===
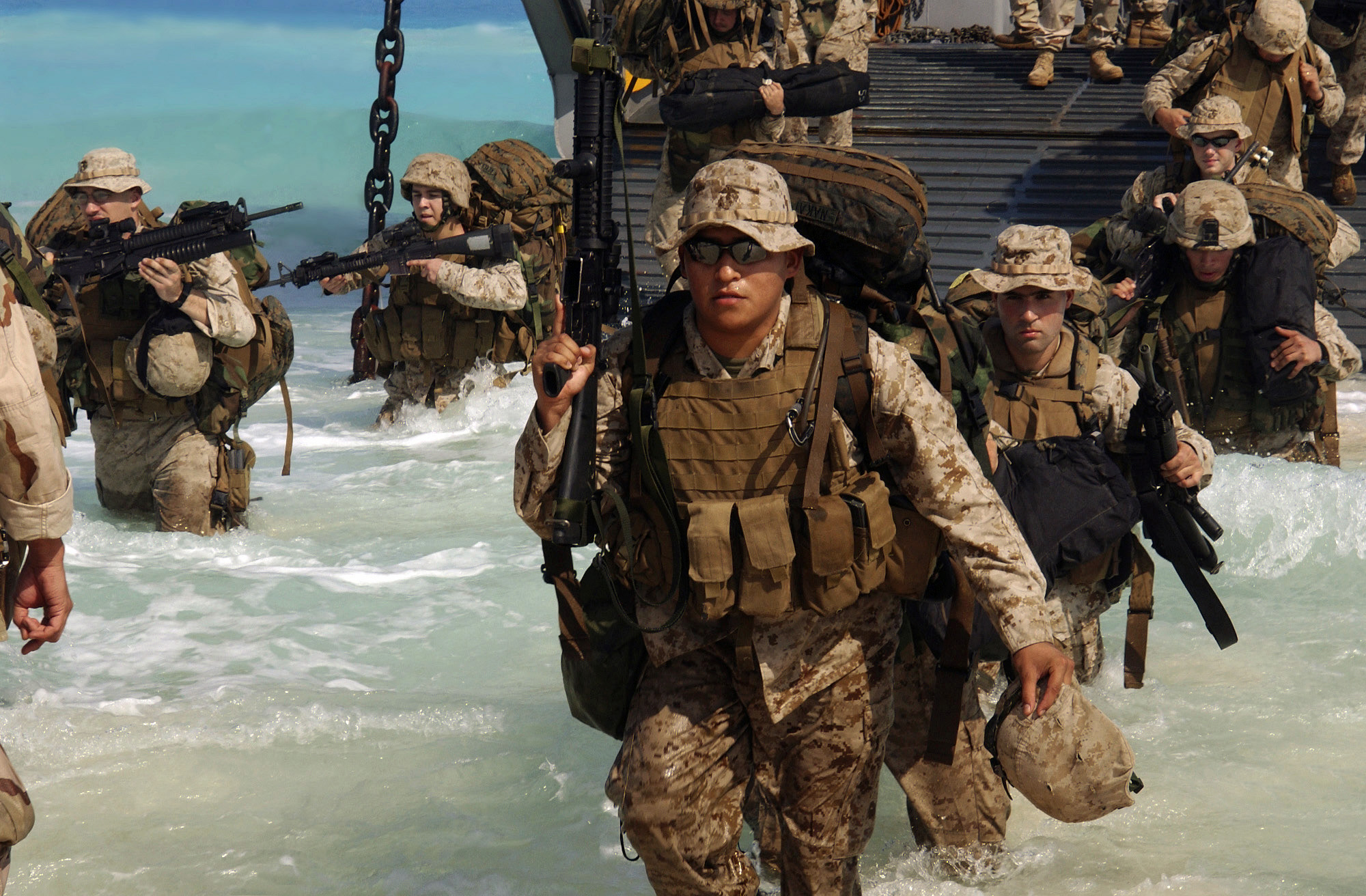
Marines from the 13th Marine Expeditionary Unit land for Operation Bright Star in Egypt

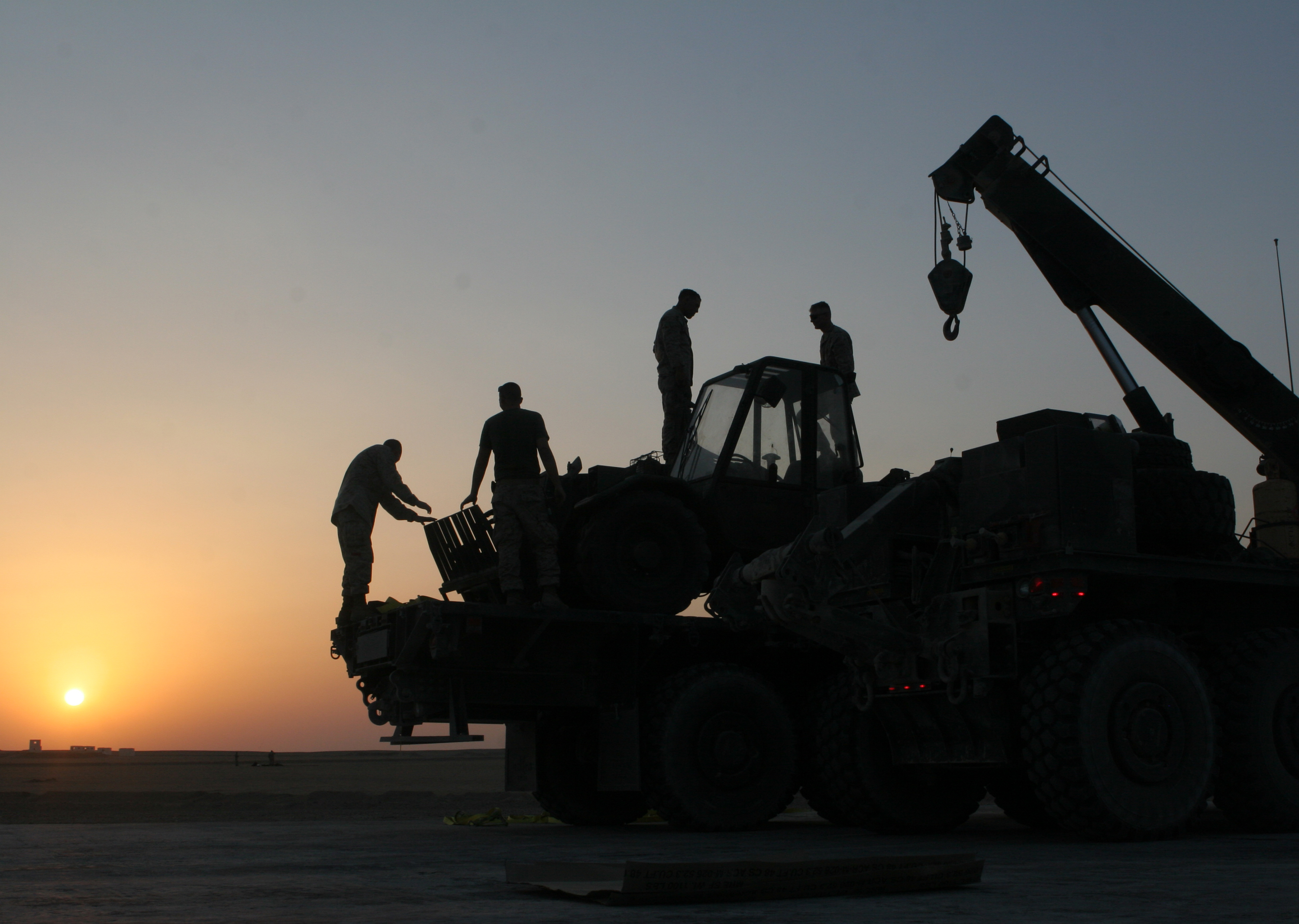
Marines from the 22nd Marine Expeditionary Unit load a forklift onto a Medium Tactical Vehicle Replacement

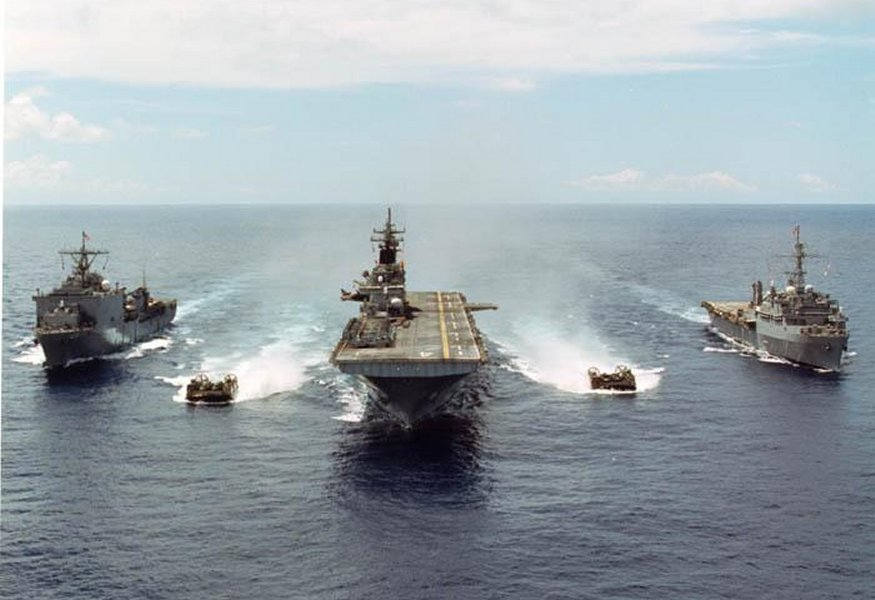
Expeditionary Strike Group Three flotilla

The Ground Combat Element (GCE) is based on the Battalion Landing Team (BLT), an infantry battalion reinforced with an artillery battery, amphibious assault vehicle platoon, combat engineer platoon, light armored reconnaissance company, reconnaissance platoon, and other units as the mission and circumstances require. The total strength is approximately 1,100 members, including Navy sailors.

The Maritime Special Purpose Force is a subgroup of the MEU, formed for low-profile missions. The MSPF force consists of four elements: an assault platoon (a direct action platoon augmented from Force Recon), a security platoon (a selected infantry platoon from the battalion landing team), reconnaissance and surveillance assets, and a headquarters section. The total strength is approximately 350 members, including Navy sailors.

=== Aviation combat element ===
The Aviation Combat Element (ACE) is a USMC composite squadron (reinforced) composed of a medium tiltrotor squadron augmented with detachments of heavy, light, and attack helicopters, one detachment of amphibious flight-deck-capable jets, and a Marine air control group detachment with tactical air command, air traffic control, direct air support, and anti-aircraft assets, as well as wing headquarters, wing communications, and wing support squadron personnel. Total strength is approximately 600 troops.

=== Logistics combat element ===
The Logistics Combat Element (LCE) (formerly Combat Service Support Element or CSSE) is based on the MEU combat logistics battalion (CLB) (formerly MEU service support group or MSSG). It contains all the logistics specialists and equipment necessary for the MEU to support and sustain itself for up to 15 days in an austere expeditionary environment. It includes service support (postal and disbursing), medical, dental, intermediate maintenance, intermediate supply (consumables and secondary reparable), transportation (distribution and landing support), explosive ordnance disposal, utilities production and distribution, bulk fuels, internal communications, and various other technical experts. It consists of approximately 300 members, including Navy sailors.

=== Command element ===
The Command Element (CE), which includes the MEU commander and his supporting staff, provides command and control over the other three elements. It includes specialized detachments for air naval gunfire liaison, reconnaissance, surveillance, specialized communications, radio reconnaissance (SIGINT), electronic warfare, Marine Corps Intelligence and counterintelligence, law enforcement, and public affairs missions. The overall strength is about 200 members, including Navy sailors.

== Expeditionary strike group ==
Recently, MEUs have been deployed within an expeditionary strike group (ESG) in the Mediterranean, the Western Pacific, and periodically, the Atlantic and Indian Oceans. An ESG is typically composed of three amphibious ships that embark the necessary troops and equipment and are escorted by a guided missile cruiser (CG) and guided missile destroyers (DDG) and submarine (SSN) support.

Before the ESG, MEUs were typically deployed as part of an amphibious ready group (ARG).

== The MEU Cycle ==
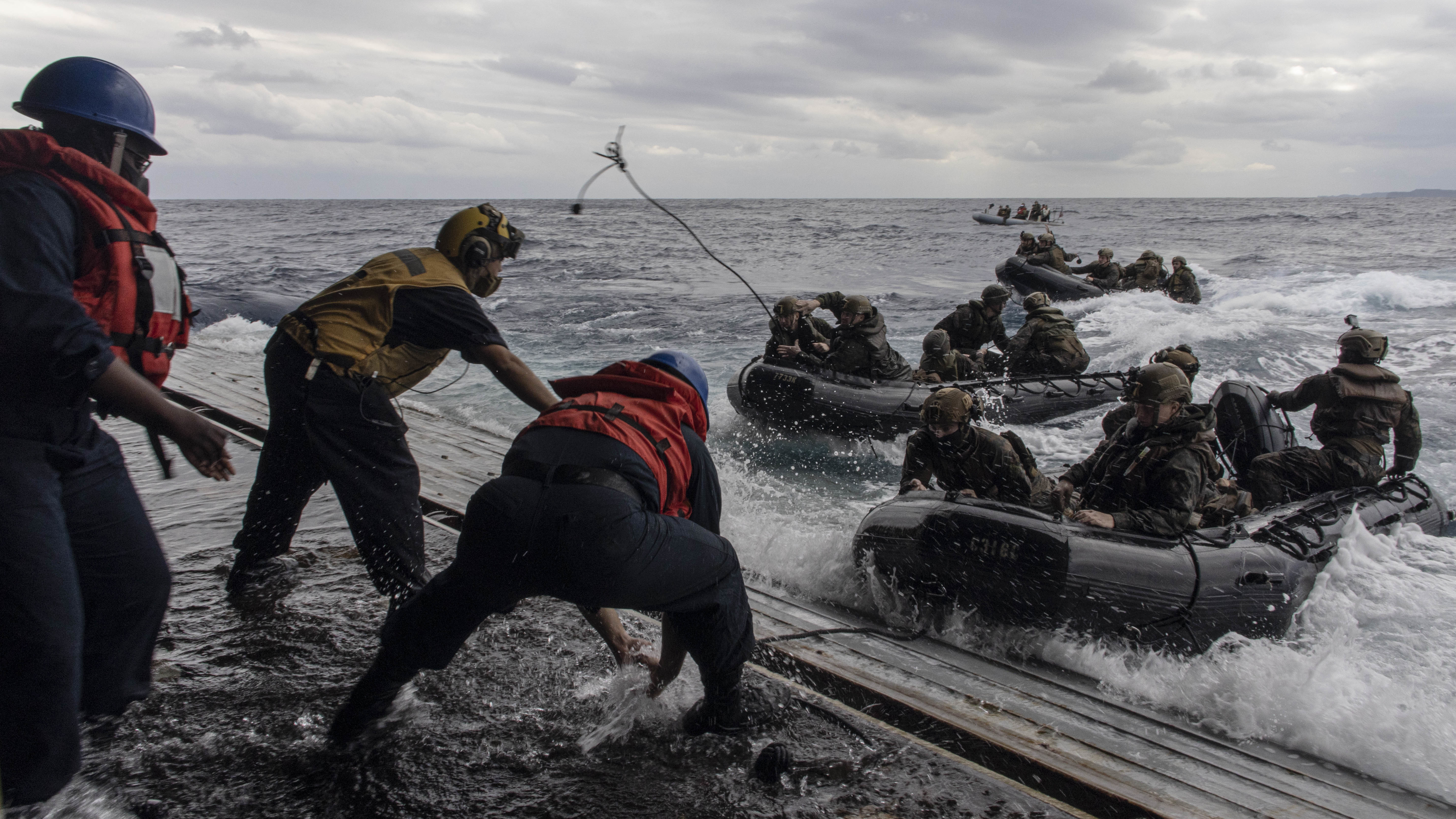
Marines with the 31st Marine Expeditionary Unit train from the amphibious transport dock ship USS Green Bay (LPD-20) in the Philippine Sea in 2022

MEUs maintain their subordinate elements in fifteen month cycles: nine months stateside (with six set aside for training), and a six-month deployment aboard ship. These cycles ensure that at least two of the seven MEUs are deployed forward at any given time.

Interim or buildup period: Upon completion of a deployment, the MEU remains "special operations capable" for approximately one month, prepared to respond to events around the world. They are not, however, considered a special operations unit by the Department of Defense. The MEU then releases its major subordinate elements (MSEs), retaining only its command element. This period provides the command element a chance to rotate select personnel and begin planning for the addition of newly assigned MSEs and “work-up” training. When the MSEs are received, the MEU begins six months of intense pre-deployment training.

Work-up period: Training during the six-month work-up period is often referred to as "crawl, walk, run". Marines and sailors progress through curriculum and exercises that teach individual, small unit, and unit tactics while integrating the separate MEU elements into a cohesive, flexible, and powerful force. The work-up period includes training in many combat and noncombat skills, to include:

- urban sniper
- mechanized and motorized raids
- non-combatant evacuation operations
- humanitarian assistance
- mass casualty
- scout swimmer
- jungle and/or mountain warfare
- riot control

Exercises conducted during the work-up period can include:

- Amphibious squadron—MEU integration training (PMINT)
- Realistic urban training exercise (RUT), formerly training in an urban environment exercise (TRUEX)
- Expeditionary strike group exercise (ESGEX)
- Special operations capable certification exercise (CERTEX or SOCCEX); prior to deployment, the MEU receives certification as special operations capable and then referred to as a "MEU(SOC)".

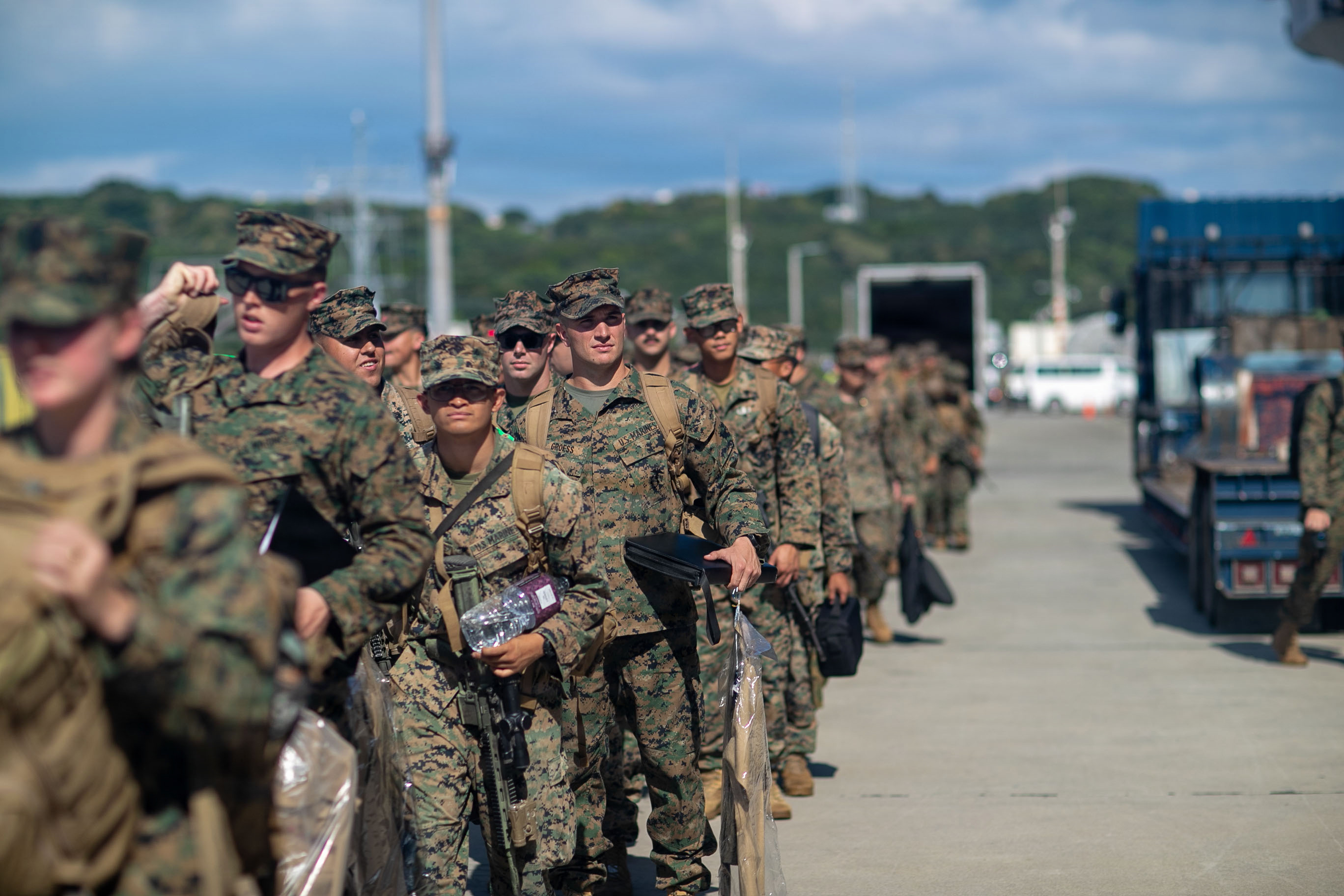
Marines with the 31st MEU embark USS Tripoli in Okinawa, Japan, November 30, 2025

Deployment: Following the work-up period, the MEU deploys for six months in support of geographic combatant commanders. During this time, the MEU is a forward-deployed, self-sustaining force that combatant commanders can direct to accomplish a variety of special operations and conventional missions.

The missions may include:

- Conventional operations (amphibious assaults and raids)
- Tactical recovery of aircraft and personnel (TRAP)
- Humanitarian assistance operations (HAO)
- Noncombatant evacuation operations (NEO)
- Security operations.

== List of MEUs ==
=== West Coast MEUs ===
West Coast MEUs fall under I Marine Expeditionary Force, and their main area of operations includes the western Pacific and Indian oceans (to include the Persian Gulf).

Official Name	Insignia	Headquarters
11th Marine Expeditionary Unit		Marine Corps Base Camp Pendleton, California
13th Marine Expeditionary Unit		Marine Corps Base Camp Pendleton, California
15th Marine Expeditionary Unit		Marine Corps Base Camp Pendleton, California

=== East Coast MEUs ===
East Coast MEUs fall under II Marine Expeditionary Force and maintain presence in the Atlantic Ocean and Mediterranean Sea.

Official Name	Insignia	Headquarters
22nd Marine Expeditionary Unit		Marine Corps Base Camp Lejeune, North Carolina
24th Marine Expeditionary Unit		Marine Corps Base Camp Lejeune, North Carolina
26th Marine Expeditionary Unit		Marine Corps Base Camp Lejeune, North Carolina

=== Japan MEU ===
The 31st MEU is the only permanently forward-deployed MEU, maintaining a presence in the Pacific Ocean at all times as part of III Marine Expeditionary Force.

Official Name	Insignia	Headquarters
31st Marine Expeditionary Unit		Marine Corps Base Camp Smedley D. Butler, Okinawa, Japan

== See also ==
- Organization of the United States Marine Corps
- Regimental combat team
