= Belleau Abbey =

Cistercian monastery in Marne, France

Coordinates: 48.7814°N 3.4475°E

Belleau Abbey, later Belleau Priory (otherwise Belle Eau or Belle-Eau) (French: Abbaye de Belleau, Prieuré de Belleau; Latin: Bella Aqua), was a Cistercian monastery in Villeneuve-la-Lionne, Marne, France, about 15 kilometres south-west of Montmirail.

== History ==
The abbey was founded in 1242 by Matthieu de Montmirail as a daughter house of Morimond Abbey. In 1510 the abbey was reduced in status to a priory. In 1567 the church was destroyed, or badly damaged, by Calvinists. The decline of the priory continued and by 1768 it had only one monk. It ceased to function, at the latest, during the French Revolution, but may well have been wound up before then.

== Buildings and site ==
The 13th-century church was enlarged during the 15th century and is all that remains of the monastery structures. The nave has been converted into a barn, and one wing of the transept is used for residential purposes. The choir and apse are ruined.

== Sources ==
- Peugniez, Bernard, 2001: Routier cistercien. Abbayes et sites. France, Belgique, Luxembourg, Suisse (new expanded edition, p.127). Moisenay: Éditions Gaud. ISBN 2-84080-044-6
