= USS Belleau Wood (LHA-3) =

Amphibious assault ship of the U.S. Navy

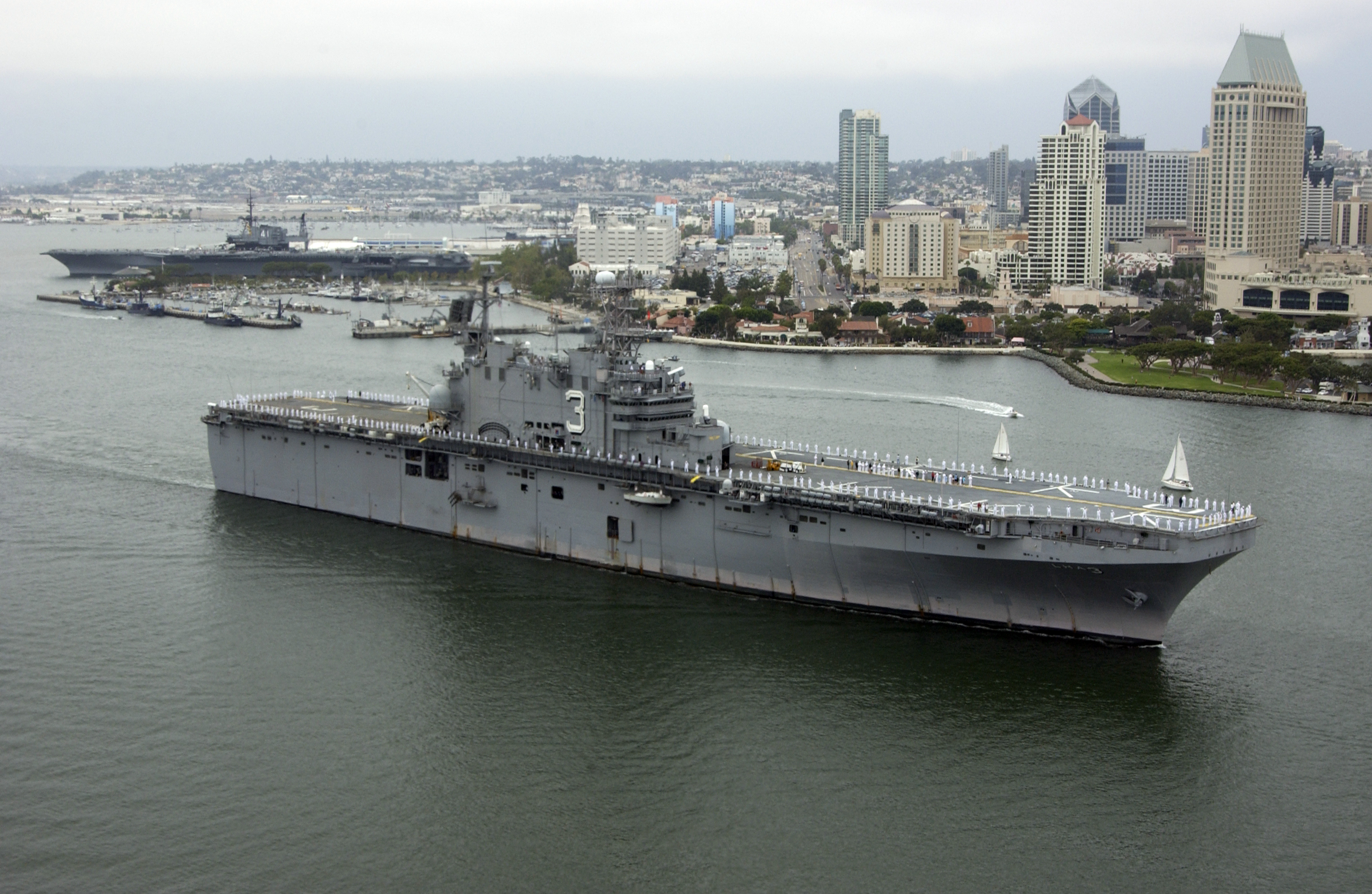
- USS Belleau Wood on 11 July 2005

History

United States
- Name: Belleau Wood
- Namesake: USS Belleau Wood (CVL-24)
- Ordered: 15 November 1969
- Builder: Ingalls Shipbuilding
- Laid down: 5 March 1973
- Launched: 11 April 1977
- Commissioned: 23 September 1978
- Decommissioned: 28 October 2005
- Renamed: from Philippine Sea
- Stricken: 28 October 2005
- Identification: Callsign: NBWD; Hull number: LHA-3
- Fate: Sunk as target, 13 July 2006
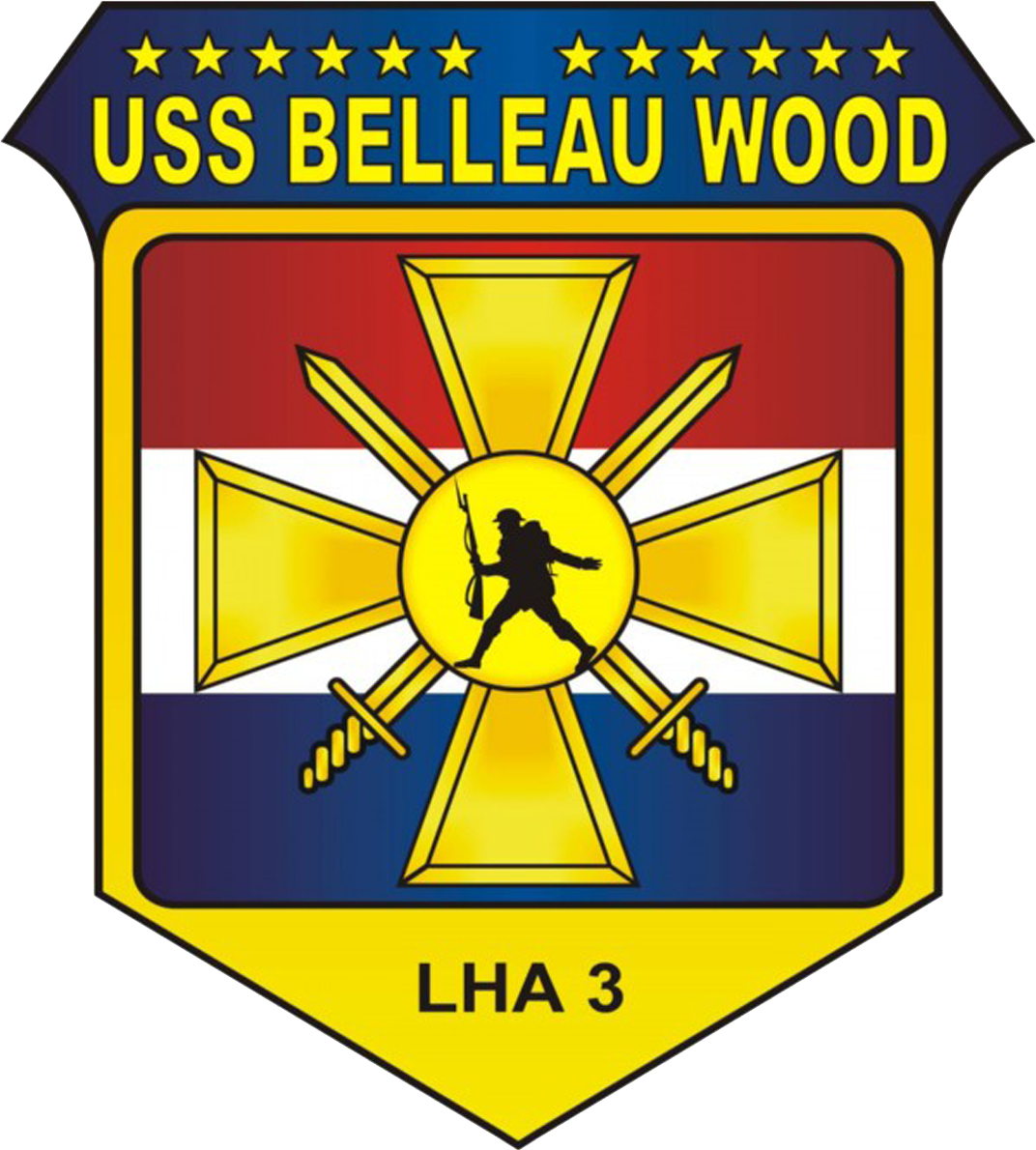
- Badge

General characteristics
- Class & type: Tarawa-class amphibious assault ship
- Displacement: 40,000 tons
- Length: 820 ft (250 m)
- Beam: 106 ft (32 m)
- Draft: 26 ft (7.9 m)
- Propulsion: Steam turbine
- Speed: 24 knots (44 km/h; 28 mph)
- Troops: 2,000 Marines plus equipment
- Complement: 930 officers and sailors
- Armament: 2 × 21 cell RAM launchers; 2 × 20 mm Phalanx CIWS; 4 × 25 mm Mk 38 Bushmaster gun mounts; 5 × 0.5 in (12.7 mm) mounts
- Aircraft carried: 30 helicopters and Harriers

USS Belleau Wood (LHA-3), nicknamed "Devil Dog", was a Tarawa-class amphibious assault ship and the second ship named after the World War I Battle of Belleau Wood. Her keel was laid down on 5 March 1973 at Pascagoula, Mississippi, by Ingalls Shipbuilding. She was launched on 11 April 1977, and commissioned on 23 September 1978.

Belleau Wood was the third of five ships in a new class (Tarawa class) of general-purpose amphibious assault ships, which combined into one ship type the functions previously performed by four different types: the landing platform helicopter (LPH), the amphibious transport dock (LPD), the amphibious cargo ship (LKA), and the dock landing ship (LSD). She was capable of landing elements of a United States Marine Corps Marine expeditionary unit (MEU) and their supporting equipment by landing craft, helicopters, or a combination of both.

== Operational history ==
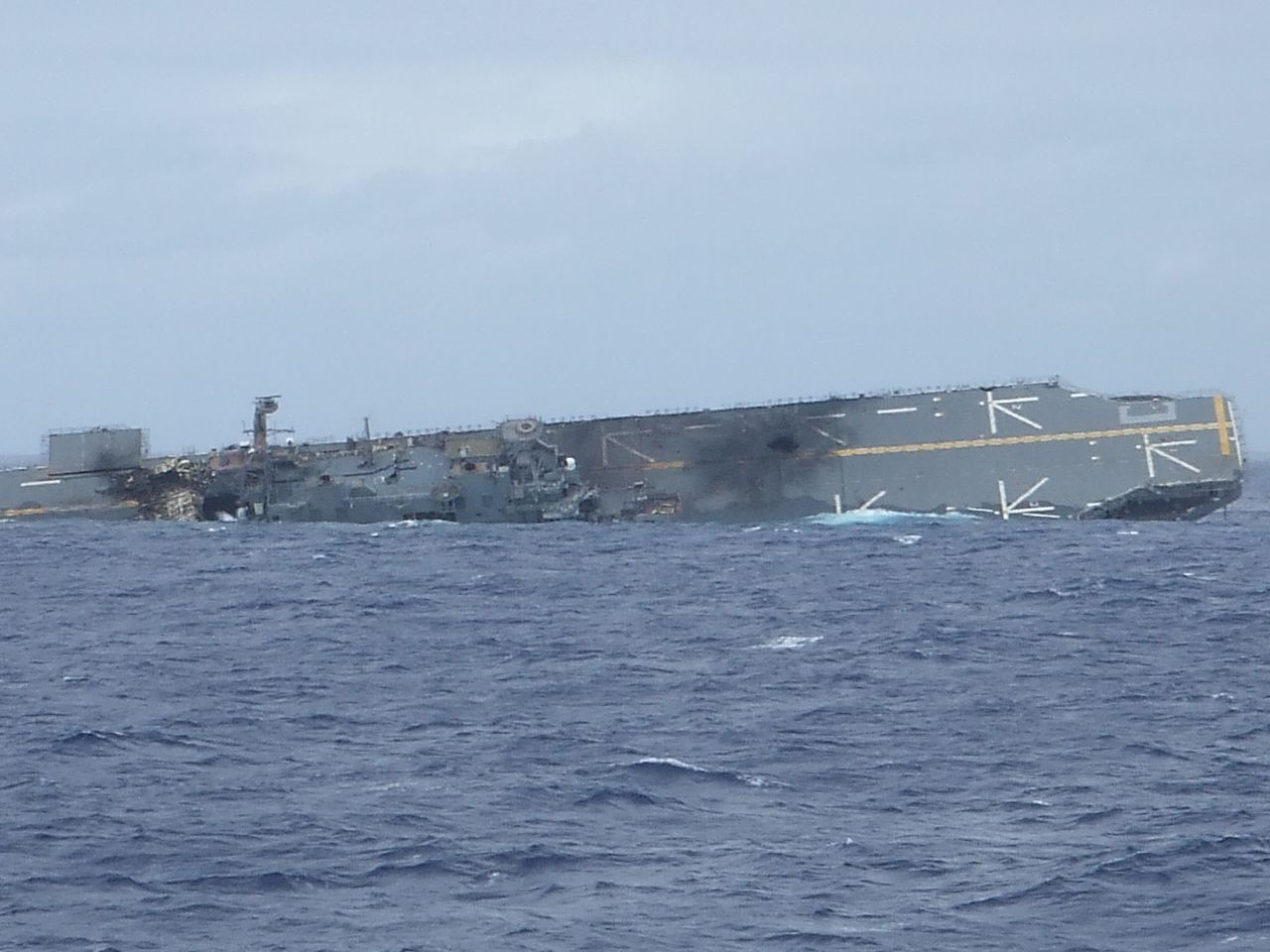
Ex-Belleau Wood rolls over and sinks following her use as a live-fire target in the 2006 RIMPAC exercises

Homeported at Naval Base San Diego, California beginning in October 1978, Belleau Wood participated in her first full-scale operation in 1979 off the coast of Hawaii. In early 1979, she reported to Long Beach Naval Shipyard in Long Beach, California for a one-year engine overhaul.

Belleau Wood began her first major deployment in January 1981. The ship rescued 150 Vietnamese refugees on April 21, 1981, earning the crew the Humanitarian Service Medal. The deployment included three major exercises and nine port visits to include Japan, Korea, Hong Kong, Philippines, Thailand, Singapore, Sri Lanka, Diego Garcia and Australia. Belleau Wood crossed the equator into the southern hemisphere on May 9th, 1981. Belleau Wood returned to San Diego in August 1981.

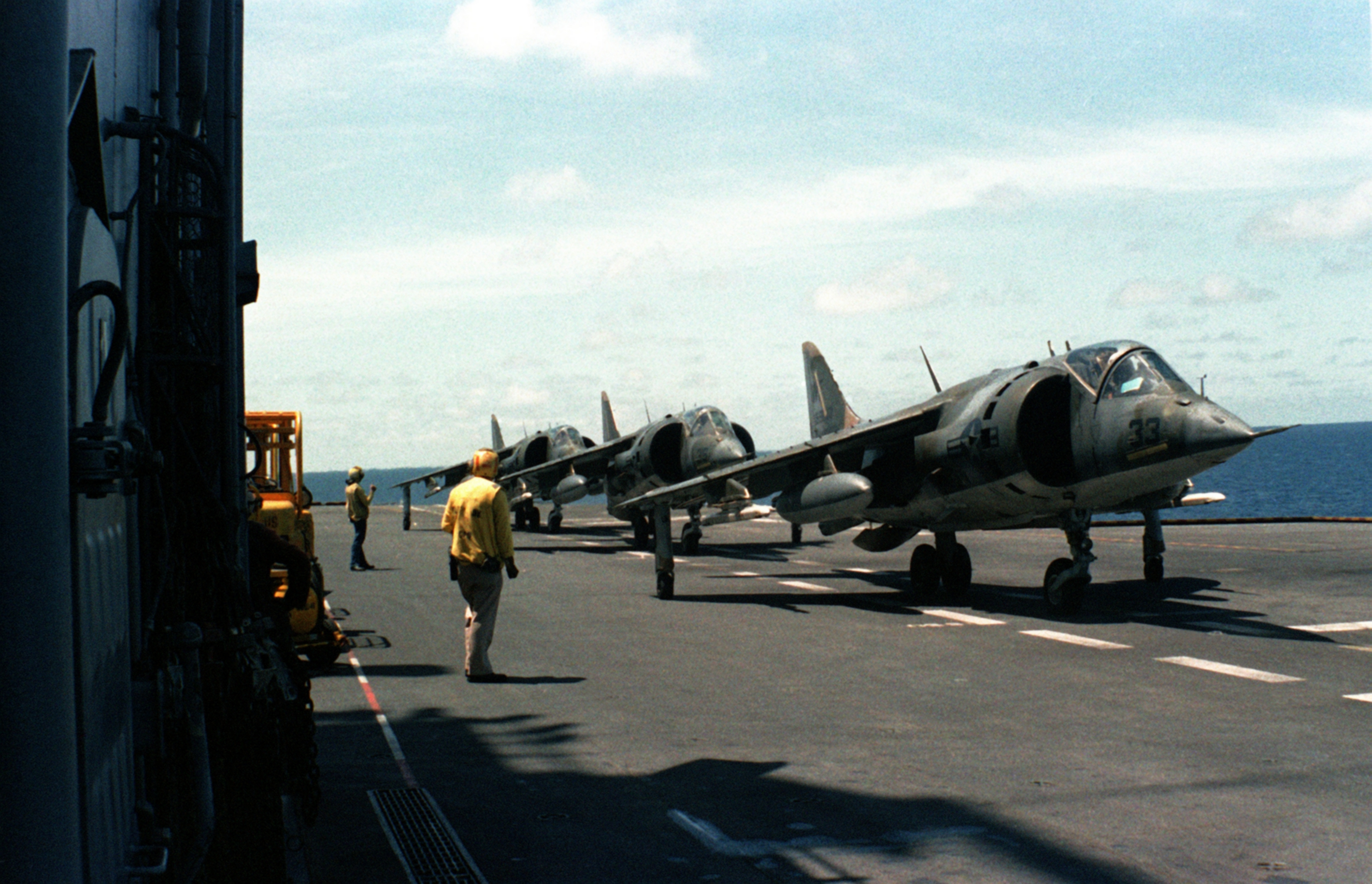
AV-8A Harriers of VMA-513 line up for launching from Belleau Wood in May 1982

August 1982 marked the ship's second deployment where she participated in four major amphibious exercises in the Philippines, Thailand, Somalia, and Australia - including Valiant Usher; Team Spirit and Jade Tiger 83 and eleven port visits. Ports visited were Honolulu, Hawaii (2 times); Hong Kong; Subic Bay, Philippines (2 times); Singapore (2 times); Phuket, Thailand; Diego Garcia; Barbara, Somalia; and Perth, Australia. The ship returned to San Diego in February 1983. She went to an extensive yard period in Naval Station Long Beach for almost eight months from early March to late October 1983. Her third successful deployment ran from January 1984. Belleau Wood joined numerous major amphibious exercises in Hawaii, Korea, and the Philippines. The ship visited twelve ports, including Honolulu, Hawaii (2 times); Hong Kong (2 times); Subic Bay, Philippines (2 times); Yokosuka, Japan; Singapore; Pohang and Pusan, South Korea and Phuket, Thailand. She returned to homeport in mid-July 1984.

The ship then completed an 11-month complex overhaul at Puget Sound Naval Shipyard in Bremerton, Washington from March 1985 to February 1986. Belleau Wood then traveled to her home base at Naval Station San Diego. After completing numerous exercises in 1986, the ship received the Battle "E" for battle readiness and was ready for deployment.

In January 1987, Belleau Wood got underway for her fourth deployment. The crew participated in four major exercises, including the first winter amphibious exercises conducted off the Aleutian Islands since World War II, and introduced the ship to the AV-8B Harrier "jump jet". The ship also received the Admiral Flatley Memorial Award for Aviation Safety in 1987.

Whilst in the Bering Sea, the ship and crew battled 90-foot (27 m) seas sailing through an area where two cyclones had merged. Belleau Wood received extensive damage from the storm which led to an extended stay in the naval shipyards at Subic Bay. Other ports of call during the deployment included Okinawa, Pohang and Pusan, Pattaya and Phuket.

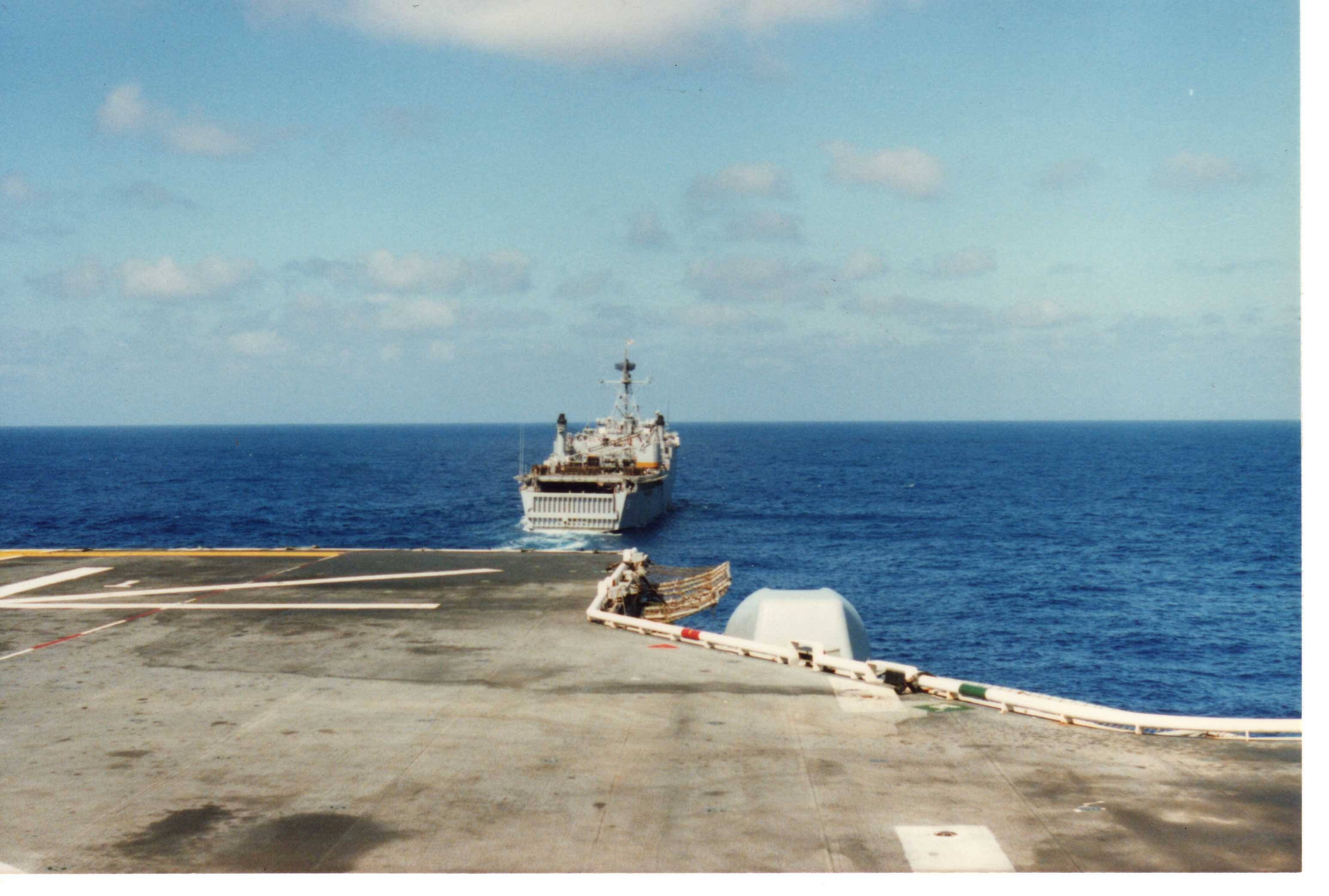
Anchorage Towing Belleau Wood

After the Crossing the Line ceremony at the Equator, Belleau Wood lost power as both engines and one of the two generators stopped, causing her to drift for five days at sea and have to be towed by USS Anchorage. Destined for Tasmania, she limped into Sydney Harbor for repairs to the boilers while Anchorage replaced her off Tasmania. Both the Belleau Wood and Midway Battle Groups sailed into Sydney Harbour. After which, the Battle Groups participated with the Australian Navy in exercises.

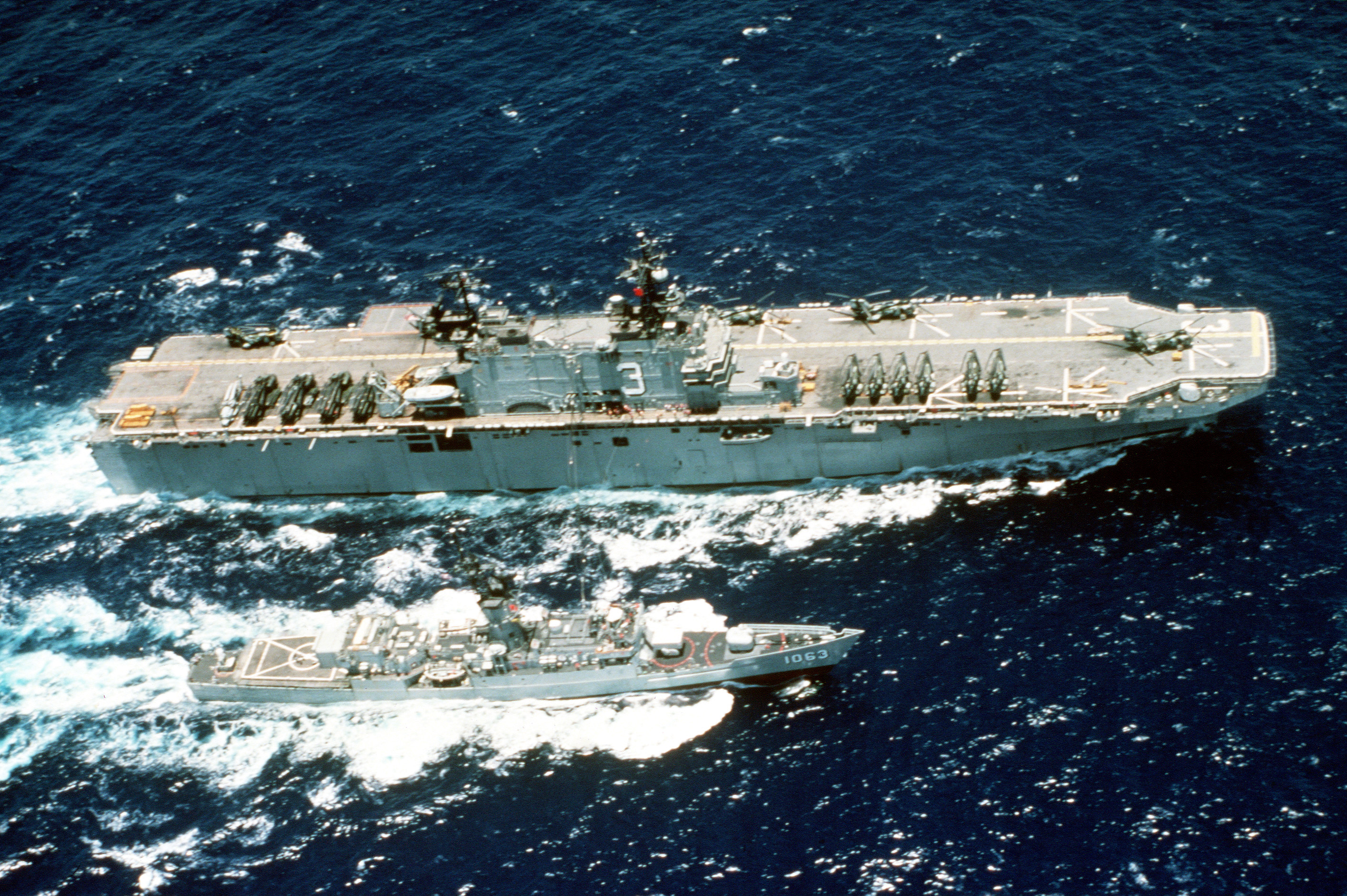
Belleau Wood in company with USS Reasoner during RIMPAC 90

Belleau Wood underwent repairs at the Long Beach Naval Shipyard during 1987–1988. In January 1989, Belleau Wood departed for the Western Pacific. Over the next five months, the ship participated in Exercise Team Spirit 89 in Korea and Exercise Valiant Usher in the Philippines and Korea. On 4 October, the ship hosted the Minister of Defense of the Soviet Union during his historic visit to the United States.

Belleau Wood entered her second complex overhaul at the Long Beach Naval Shipyard in 1990. Major work included an upgrade to CIWS and installation of the Rolling Airframe Missile (RAM) system. On 31 August 1992, Belleau Wood sailed out of San Diego, bound for her new homeport in Sasebo, Japan. During this transit, the ship provided disaster relief to the people of Kauai, Hawaii after Hurricane Iniki ravaged the island. For this, the crew was awarded its second Humanitarian Service Medal. On arrival in Japan, Belleau Wood joined Amphibious Group 1 and Amphibious Squadron 11, and became the world's only forward-deployed large-deck amphibious ship.

On the night of 27 October 1992, two members of the Belleau Wood crew murdered a fellow crew member in a public park just outside the Sasebo Naval Base in what was later described as one of the most horrific homophobic acts in US naval history. The murder and subsequent cover-up by the United States Navy became one of the strongest arguments forcing the US Department of Defense to implement the "Don't ask Don't tell" policy on openly gay men and women serving in the US military. The murder of the crew member and the subsequent collective punishment implemented by the replacement commanding officer led to a diminished ability of Belleau Wood as a naval asset. Following the exposé published in Esquire Magazine relating to the murder and collective punishment by the new commanding officer, the ship was given the moniker of the "Prison Ship Belleau Wood" by many of the ship's crew. It was the first murder of this kind in the city of Sasebo for nearly 90 years.

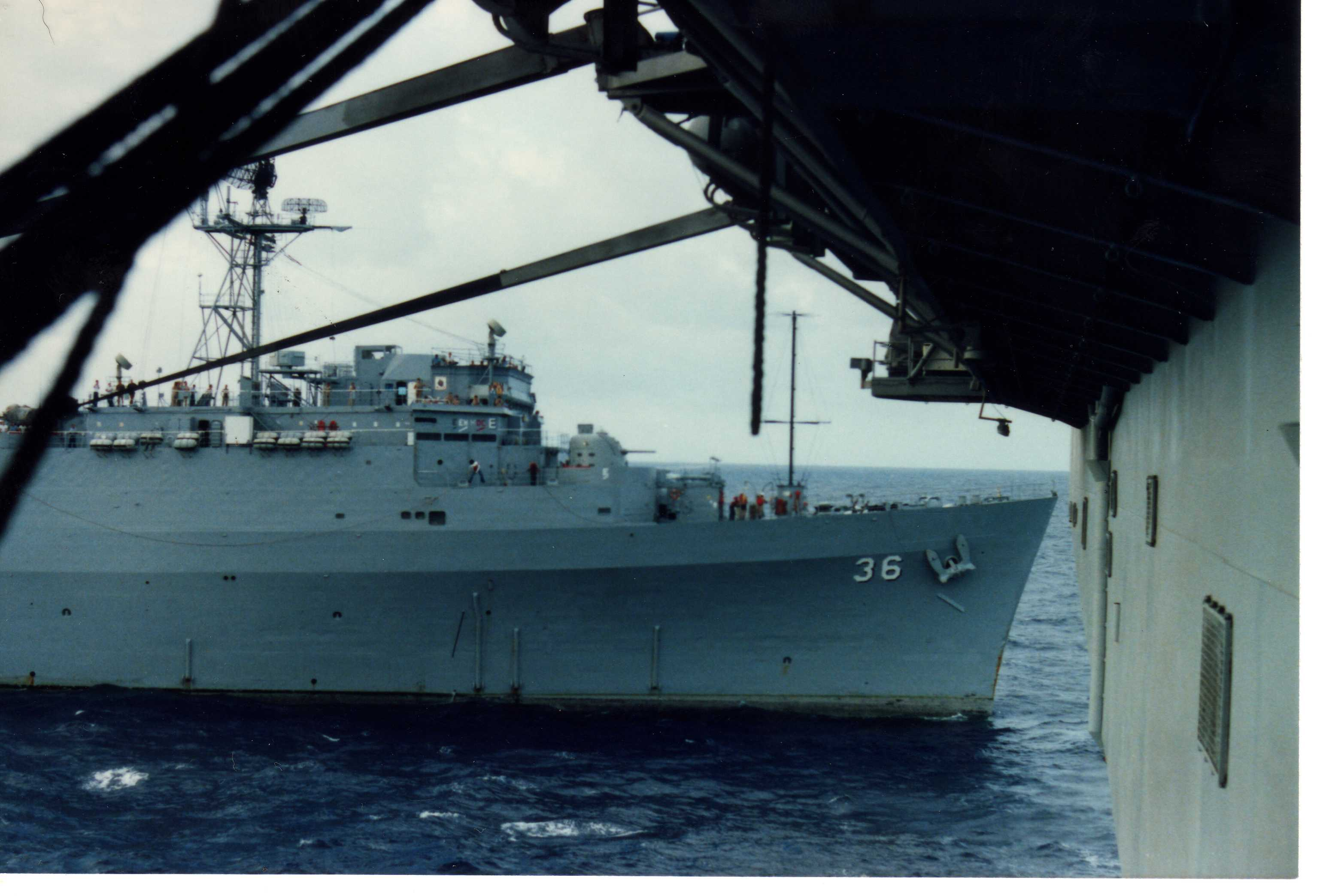
Anchorage attempting to attach a tow line to Belleau Wood. They couldn't shoot the line, so they just handed it over...

On 24 November 1992, Belleau Wood became the last ship to sail out of the Philippines while conducting the final withdrawal of U.S. forces from Subic Bay Naval Base and Naval Air Station Cubi Point.

Following her move to Japan, Belleau Wood became a familiar sight at joint military exercises such as Valiant Usher in Australia, Team Spirit in Korea, Cobra Gold in Thailand, and Tandem Thrust near Guam (originally in Australia). Belleau Wood also became the first large-deck Navy ship to undergo pierside maintenance by COMLOGWESTPAC in Singapore.

From January to April 1995, Belleau Wood served as the Command Platform for Operation United Shield. In 1996, the Belleau Wood was one of several naval movements involved in the Third Taiwan Strait Crisis.

Belleau Wood was deployed to East Timor as part of the Australian-led INTERFET peacekeeping task force from 5 to 28 October 1999.

In July 2000, Belleau Wood took part in the largest crew swap to date when she was relieved as a forward-deployed amphibious assault ship. The procedure started when USS Essex arrived in Sasebo on 13 July 2000. The swap was part of a planned rotation of forward-deployed naval forces in Japan and was the third crew-swap exchange. The ships’ crews simply switched ships, minimizing the impact of moving families from homeport to homeport. Sailors in Sasebo assigned to Belleau Wood, moved on to Essex, while sailors from San Diego assigned to Essex moved aboard Belleau Wood. Belleau Wood and the San Diego–based crew then returned to San Diego in mid-August to begin overhaul and maintenance cycles.

From 17 January to 16 June 2001 Belleau Wood conducted a five-month dry dock planned maintenance availability, during which time she had a fifth air conditioning system installed, upgraded collection holding and transfer systems, and revamped combat system and intelligence suites.

On 15 June 2002, the ship deployed to the Indian Ocean in support of Operation Enduring Freedom. While deployed, she participated in exercises Infinite Moonlight in Jordan and Eager Mace in Kuwait. She also provided humanitarian assistance off the east coast of Djibouti in October and off East Timor in November before returning to San Diego on 15 December. During 2002, Belleau Wood was the backdrop for the making of the movie Antwone Fisher.

On 22 January 2003, Belleau Wood entered the National Steel and Shipbuilding Company Shipyard at San Diego for a complex overhaul that lasted until 8 October 2003. In November 2003, Belleau Wood was the site of another first when Brigadier General Joseph V. Medina took command of Expeditionary Strike Group Three, of which Belleau Wood was the flagship. This event marked the first time in history that a United States Marine Corps officer took command of a naval flotilla.

In July 2004, Belleau Wood led the amphibious ready group that transported the 11th Marine Expeditionary Unit to Kuwait and disembarked the Marines. After months of sailing in the Persian Gulf, the ships returned to San Diego without the Marines who later flew back to CONUS. The ship was decommissioned on 28 October 2005. She was expended as a target and sunk off the coast of Hawaii as part of RIMPAC '06 exercises on 13 July 2006.

== Significance of the name ==
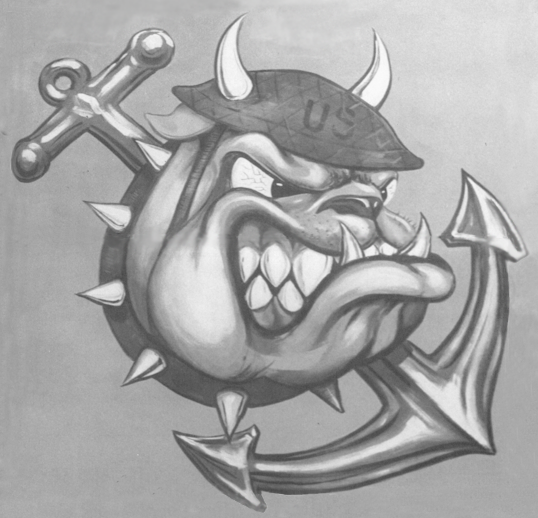
USS Belleau Wood's mascot, as displayed on the island superstructure

The ship was named in memory of the World War I Battle of Belleau Wood, in which United States Marines of the Fourth Brigade, American Expeditionary Forces, defeated German forces after nearly four weeks of intense fighting. It is said that the Germans referred to them as Teufel Hunde (correctly "Teufelshunde")—Devil Dogs—and it was this moniker that became the ship's mascot, and one of the nicknames for US Marines (Devil Dog).

=== Coat of arms ===
The official seal of Belleau Wood is a blend of symbols. An image of a fighting U.S. Marine, in World War I battle dress, is at the center of the plaque. He carries a rifle with bayonet, and seems to be beckoning someone to follow him. Surrounding the figure are the gold cross, shield and swords of the Croix de guerre, the French medal awarded to the Marines who distinguished themselves at Belleau Wood. In that tradition, Marines of the Fourth Brigade are permitted to wear the French fourragère to this day.

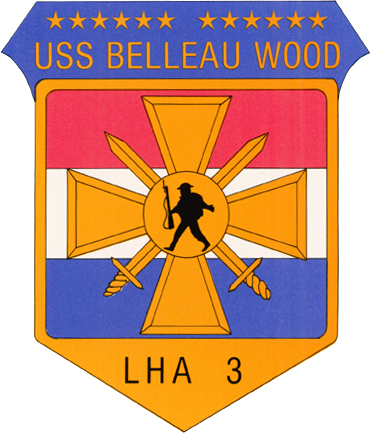
USS Belleau Wood's Coat of Arms

Twelve gold battle stars in a field of blue line the top of the coat of arms. They stand for the World War II record of the first USS Belleau Wood (CVL-24). The gap between the sixth and seventh stars represents the ship's only break in her war record. On 30 October 1944, while off Leyte Gulf, Belleau Wood was struck by a kamikaze aircraft. The light aircraft carrier had to undergo repairs and an overhaul, hence the gap.

Blue and gold, prevailing hues of the coat of arms, are the traditional colors of the United States Navy. The tricolor (red over white over blue) is a reminder that the Battle of Belleau Wood occurred in France, and that Marines who gave their lives at Belleau Wood did so in the defense of another nation's freedom. The segments also bring to mind the colors of the United States.

=== Awards and citations ===

- Secretary of the Navy Letter of Commendation
- Precedence of awards is from top to bottom, left to right:
- Top Row - Joint Meritorious Unit Award - Navy Unit Commendation
- Second Row - Navy Meritorious Unit Commendation (2) - Navy Battle "E" Ribbon (13 stars) - Navy Expeditionary Medal
- Bottom Row - National Defense Service Medal - Armed Forces Expeditionary Medal (2) - Humanitarian Service Medal (1-Boat People, 28 April 1981)
