= Amphibious ready group =

US Amphibious Assault Group

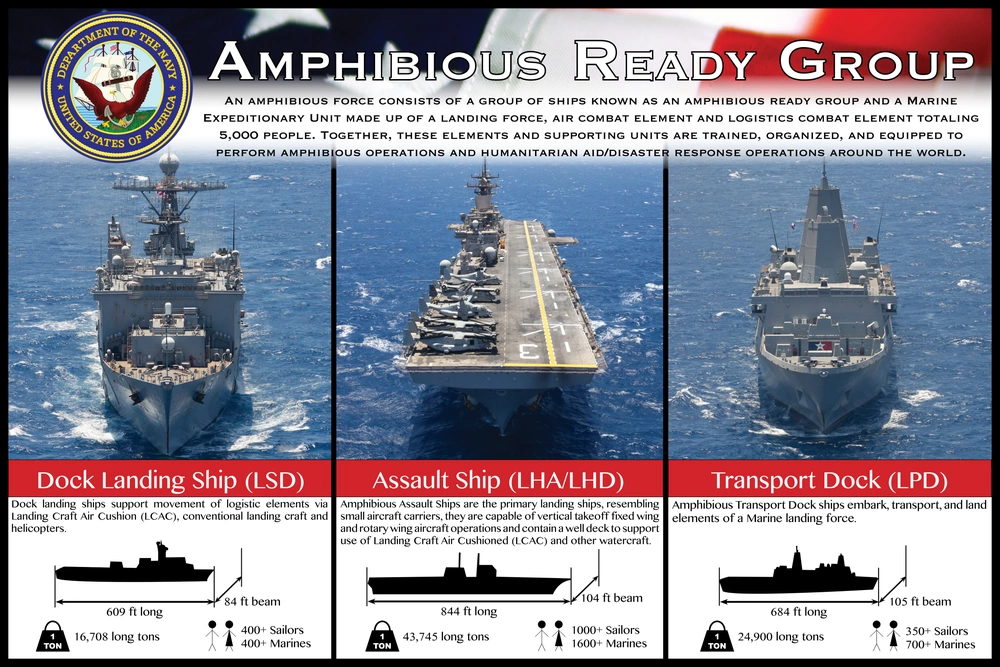
A U.S. Navy Amphibious Ready Group

An amphibious ready group (ARG) of the United States Navy consists of a naval element—a group of warships known as an Amphibious Task Force (ATF)—and a landing force (LF) of U.S. Marines (and occasionally U.S. Army soldiers), in total about 5,000 people. Together, these elements and supporting units are trained, organized, and equipped to perform amphibious operations.

== Composition ==
A typical U.S. Amphibious Readiness Group consists of:

Ships

- One amphibious assault ship: a Landing Helicopter Assault (LHA) or Landing Helicopter Dock (LHD): the primary landing ship, resembling a small aircraft carrier, designed to transport troops into the war zone by air using transport helicopters. In a secondary role, these ships perform sea control and limited power projection missions using AV-8B Harrier II or F-35B Lightning II Marine aircraft and Navy airborne assets including MH-60S Seahawk. There are currently two classes of amphibious assault ships in service: the Wasp-class (LHD) and the America-class (LHA) (Flights 0 & I).
- One amphibious transport dock ship: a Landing Platform Dock (LPD): a warship that transports troops into the war zone by sea, primarily using conventional landing craft and Landing Craft Air Cushion (LCAC) hovercraft, although they also have the capability of operating helicopters from their flight decks as well. There is currently one class of LPDs in service: the San Antonio-class (Flights I & II).
- One dock landing ship (LSD): a warship supporting amphibious operations including landings onto hostile shores via LCAC, conventional landing craft, and helicopters. There are currently two classes of LSDs in service: the Harpers Ferry-class and the Whidbey Island-class.

Troops and equipment

- A Marine Expeditionary Unit (MEU): the smallest configuration of a Marine Air-Ground Task Force that is deployed from an amphibious assault ship. Each MEU includes: a ground combat element of a Marine infantry battalion reinforced with artillery, combat engineers, amphibious vehicles, light armored vehicles, and other ground combat assets; an aviation combat element composed of a composite squadron of rotary-wing aircraft and AV-8B Harrier II ground attack and close air support jets, and an Air Traffic Control and command and control detachment; a battalion-sized logistics combat element, and a command element. Each Marine Expeditionary Unit (MEU) typically consists of about 2,200 Marines and is usually commanded by a colonel. The makeup of the MEU can be customized as situations require; additional artillery, armor, or air units can be attached, including squadrons of F/A-18 Hornet multirole jet fighters (deployed from aircraft carriers or ground bases).

Aircraft

- AV-8B Harrier IIs or F-35B Lightning IIs: ground-attack aircraft designed to attack and destroy surface targets. F-35Bs also have the secondary role of fighter support.
- MV-22B Ospreys or CH-53E Super Stallions transport personnel, supplies and equipment in support of amphibious and shore operations.
- AH-1Z Vipers: attack helicopters providing fire support and fire support coordination to the landing force during amphibious assaults and subsequent operations ashore.
- UH-1Y Venom: Provides command and control during heliborne operations as well a light attack and assault capabilities.
- USMC MV-22B squadrons are designated as Marine Medium Tiltrotor Squadrons (VMM), and CH-53E squadrons as Marine Heavy Helicopter Squadrons (HMH). When assigned to a MEU, the detachments of the various other squadrons are combined with either the MV-22 or CH-53 squadron to create a reinforced, composite squadron. The reinforced squadron is designated as VMM-XXX(REIN) for MV-22s or HMH-XXX(REIN) for CH-53s, where the Xs are the squadron's number. As such, the various aircraft will don the tail codes and markers of the VMM or HMH squadron, though will usually keep their own squadron tail art.

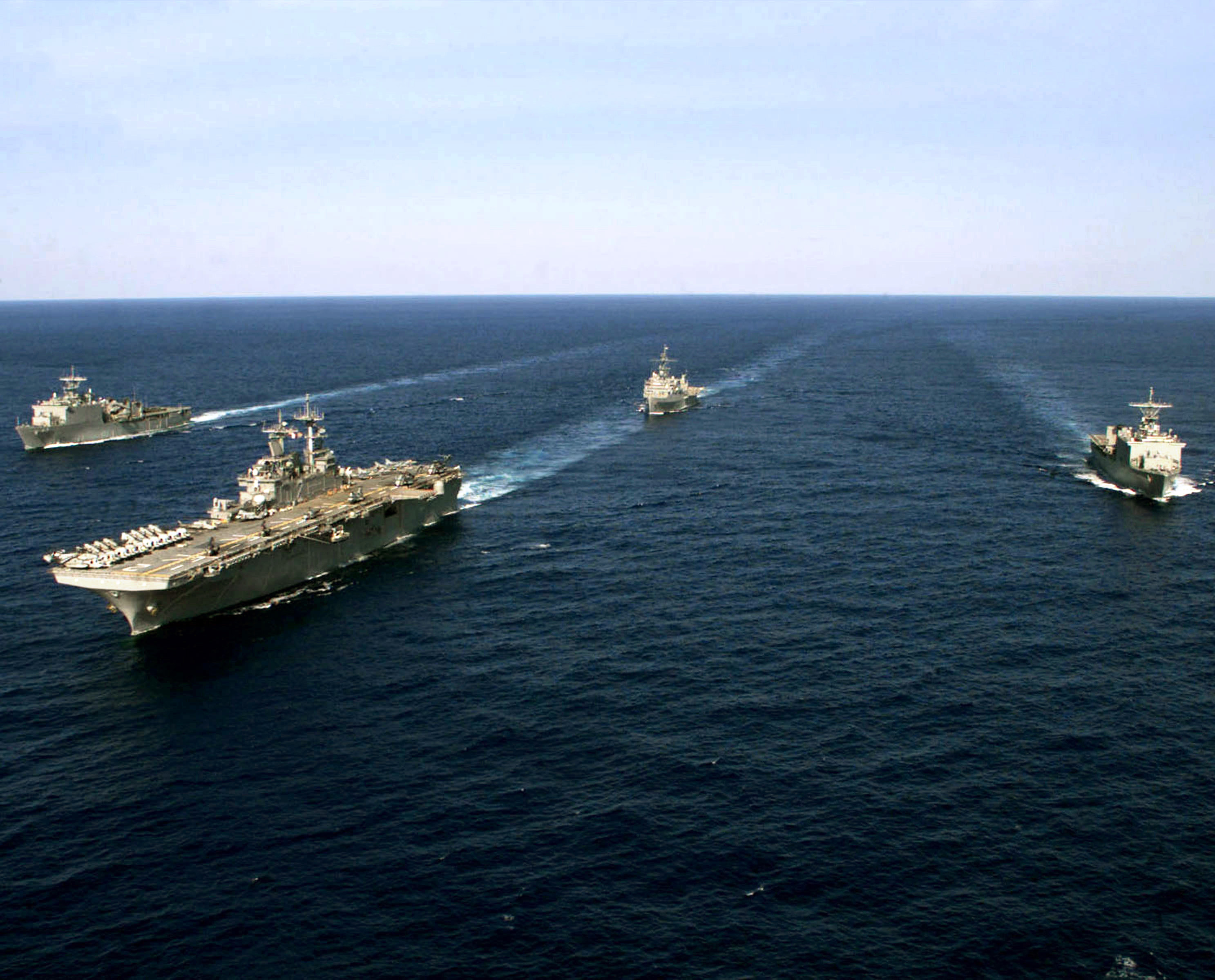
An Amphibious Ready Group in the Pacific Ocean, March 2002.

The resulting forces may range from a single Amphibious Ready Group/Marine Expeditionary Unit (Special Operations Capable) [ARG/MEU (SOC)], to a larger organization capable of employing a Marine Expeditionary Brigade (MEB) or even a Marine Expeditionary Force (MEF).

Amphibious forces must be capable of performing missions ranging from humanitarian assistance and disaster relief to major theater war (MTW). Additionally, they can be configured and deployed to operate at various levels of conflict and in multiple theaters simultaneously. They can provide a presence that may preclude adventurous actions by a potential belligerent.

Because they are sea-based and because the decision to position and engage amphibious forces will always be easily reversible, amphibious forces greatly expand the repertoire of available response options. Among other national resources, they are particularly well placed to provide a demonstration of the United States's commitment and resolve to friends and allies as well as adversaries.

Normally two to three ARGs are forward deployed: one in the Mediterranean Sea/Persian Gulf–Indian Ocean area, and one or two in the western Pacific Ocean area. The other ships of the ARG are either working up to deploy, in transit, or in overhaul. One ARG/MEU, known as Task Force 76/Expeditionary Strike Group 7, is forward based in Sasebo and Okinawa, Japan.

In most cases, the ATF will be deployed under the protective umbrella of a carrier strike group (CSG), which provides cover for the ATF and combat support to operations ashore. Ships of the ATF are capable of embarking and supporting other forces when the mission requires, including the United States Army, Special Operations Forces (SOF), or other joint and combined forces.

== See also ==
- Fleet Marine Force
- Expeditionary strike group
- Carrier battle group
- Amphibious warfare ship
