= City of Portland =

City of Portland may refer to:

- City of Portland (train) - a passenger train that used to run between Chicago and Portland Oregon
- City of Portland (Victoria), a former local government district in Australia
- City of Portland IV - the fourth of a series of fireboats operated by the City of Portland, Maine

== See also ==
- Portland (disambiguation)
