= Portland =

Portland most commonly refers to:

- Portland, Oregon, the most populous city in the U.S. state of Oregon
- Portland, Maine, the most populous city in the U.S. state of Maine
- Isle of Portland, a tied island in the English Channel

Portland may also refer to:

== Places ==
=== Australia ===
- Cape Portland, Tasmania
- Portland, New South Wales, named after the first Australian cement works
- Portland, Victoria, a city
  - City of Portland (Victoria), a former local government area (LGA)

=== Canada ===
- Portland, Ontario, a police village
- Portland, Newfoundland and Labrador, a settlement
- Port Lands or Portlands, a neighborhood of Toronto, Ontario
- Portland Estates, Nova Scotia, a neighborhood of Woodlawn, Nova Scotia
- Portland Inlet, an inlet between southeastern Alaska and British Columbia
  - Portland Canal, an arm of Portland Inlet
- Portland Island (British Columbia)

=== United Kingdom ===
- Isle of Portland, a tied island of Dorset, the origin of many uses of the name
  - Portland (ward), an electoral district
  - Portland Harbour
  - HM Prison Portland
- Portland, Somerset, a location

=== United States ===
- Portland City, Alaska, now Hyder, Alaska
- Portland, Arkansas, a city
- Portland, Fremont County, Colorado, an unincorporated community
- Portland, Ouray County, Colorado, a census-designated place
- Portland, Connecticut, a town
  - Portland (CDP), Connecticut, a CDP within the town
- Portland, Georgia, an unincorporated community
- Portland, Illinois (disambiguation), several places
- Portland, Indiana, a city
- Portland, former name for Fountain, Indiana, an unincorporated community
- Portland Township, Cerro Gordo County, Iowa, a township
  - Portland, Iowa, a census-designated place within the township
- Portland Township, Kossuth County, Iowa
- Portland Township, Plymouth County, Iowa
- Portland, Kansas, an unincorporated community
- Portland, Kentucky. an unincorporated community
- Portland, Louisville, a neighborhood of Louisville, Kentucky
- Portland, Maine, a city
- Portland Township, Michigan, a township
  - Portland, Michigan, a city within the township
- Portland, Missouri, an unincorporated community
- Portland, New York, a town
- Portland, North Dakota, a city
- Portland, Ohio, an unincorporated community
- Portland, Oregon, a city, and the most populous city in the world named Portland
- Portland, Pennsylvania, a borough
- Portland, Tennessee, a city
- Portland, Texas, a city
- Portland, Dodge County, Wisconsin, a town
  - Portland (community), Dodge County, Wisconsin, an unincorporated community
- Portland, Monroe County, Wisconsin, a town

=== Other countries ===
- Portland Street, a street in the Kowloon area, Hong Kong
- Portland, County Tipperary, Ireland, a townland
- Portland Parish, Jamaica, a parish
- Portland Point, Jamaica, a headland
- Portland, New Zealand, a locality
- Portland Island (New Zealand)
- Portland, Mitchells Plain, a neighborhood of Cape Town, South Africa

== Arts and entertainment ==
- Portland (film), a 1996 Danish film
- "Portland" (song), by Drake, 2017
- Portland, a fictional area in 2001 video game Grand Theft Auto III

== Businesses and organisations ==
- Portland (restaurant), in London, England
- Portland Club (London), England, recognized authority on the games of whist and bridge
- Portland Club (Portland, Maine), U.S.
- Portland College, in Nottinghamshire, England
- Portland Communications, a British political consultancy and public relations agency
- Portland Gallery, in London, England

== People ==
- Portland Hoffa (1905–1990), an American comedian
- Earl of Portland, and Duke of Portland, a title in the Peerage of England

== Transportation ==
- City of Portland (train), between Chicago, Illinois, and Portland, Oregon
- Portland (shipwreck), sunk in the Portland Gale off New England in 1898
- Portland (sidewheeler 1853)
- Portland (1875 tugboat)
- Portland (1947 tugboat), a preserved sternwheel tugboat based in Portland, Oregon
- HMS Portland, the name of several ships of the Royal Navy
- USS Portland, the name of several US Navy ships

== Other uses ==
- Portland cement, a building product
- Portland sheep, a breed of sheep
- Portland stone, a limestone geological formation in England
- Portland Formation, a geological formation in the US

== See also ==
- Portlandia (disambiguation)
- Portland Museum (disambiguation)
- Battle of Portland, off the Isle of Portland in 1653
- Battle of Portland Harbor, near Portland, Maine in 1863
- Portland Gale, a storm off New England in 1898
