= Portland metropolitan area (disambiguation) =

The Portland metropolitan area is the metropolitan area centered on Portland, Oregon.

The Portland metropolitan area may also refer to:

- The Portland, Maine metropolitan area, United States

== See also ==
- Portland (disambiguation)
