= Neighborhoods of Portland =

Neighborhoods of Portland may refer to:

- Neighborhoods of Portland, Maine
- Neighborhoods of Portland, Oregon

== See also ==
- Portland (disambiguation)
