= HMS Portland =

Eight ships of the Royal Navy have been named HMS Portland, either after Portland Harbour in Dorset or after holders of the title of the Duke of Portland:

- English ship Portland (1653) was a 50-gun fourth rate launched at Wapping in 1653 and burnt to avoid capture in 1692.
- HMS Portland (1693) was a 48-gun fourth rate launched in 1693, rebuilt in 1723 and broken up in 1743.
- HMS Portland (1744) was a 50-gun fourth rate launched in 1744 and sold in 1763.
- HMS Portland (1770) was a 50-gun fourth rate launched in 1770. She was converted to a 10-gun storeship in 1800 and a prison ship in 1802. She was sold in 1817.
- HMS Portland (1795) was a barge probably used to defend Plymouth. She was purchased in 1795 and was sold on 29 December 1799 for £155.
- HMS Portland (1822) was a 52-gun fourth rate launched in 1822. She was to have been named HMS Kingston, but this was changed before launch in 1817. She was sold in 1862.
- HMS Portland was to have been a Bangor-class minesweeper. She was laid down in 1941 and renamed HMS Taitam later that year. The Japanese captured her in 1941 whilst she was under construction; she became the Japanese minesweeper M/S 101. The Americans sank her in 1945.
- HMS Portland (F79) is a Type 23 frigate launched in 1999 and currently in service.

== Battle honours ==
Ships named Portland have earned the following battle honours:

- Scheveningen 1653
- Lowestoft 1665
- Four Days' Battle 1666
- Orfordness 1666
- Coventry 1709
- Auguste 1746
- Ushant 1747
- Magnanime 1748
- Lagos 1759
- Quiberon Bay 1759

== See also ==
- HMS Portland Prize was a 50-gun fourth rate, previously the Auguste. She was captured in 1746 by HMS Portland and was sold in 1749.
- HMS Portland Bill was a repair ship launched in 1945 and sold into civilian service in 1951, where she was renamed Zinnia.
- USS Portland
