= USS Ponce (LPD-15) =

Navy ship (1971–2017)

USS Ponce (AFSB-15)
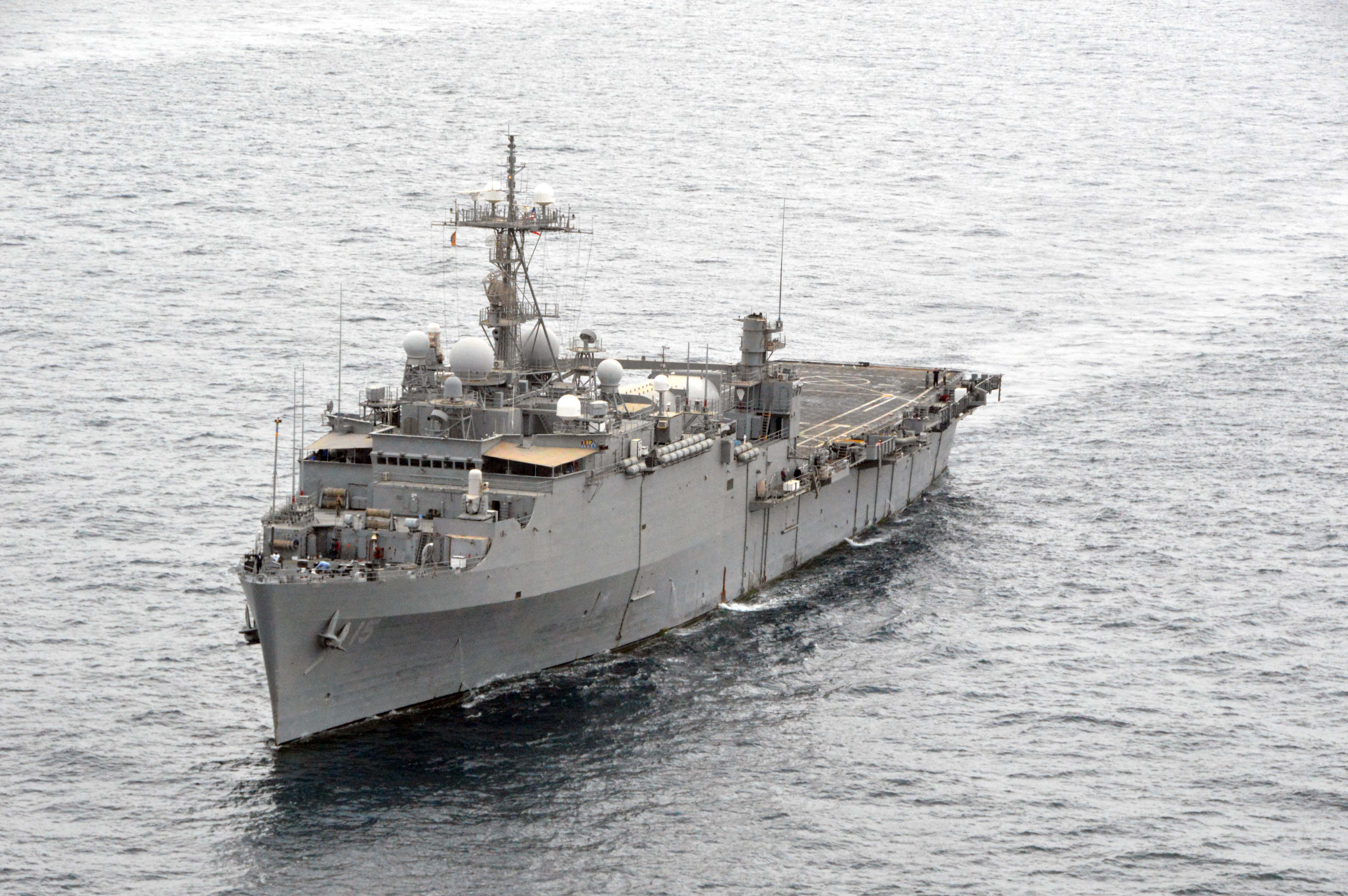
- In 2013, after AFSB conversion

History

United States
- Name: Ponce
- Namesake: Ponce, Puerto Rico
- Ordered: 17 May 1965
- Builder: Lockheed Shipbuilding
- Laid down: 31 October 1966
- Launched: 20 May 1970
- Commissioned: 10 July 1971
- Decommissioned: 14 October 2017
- Stricken: 13 November 2017
- Identification: Callsign: NSBJ
- Nickname(s): Proud Lion
- Fate: Scrapped in Brownsville 2022
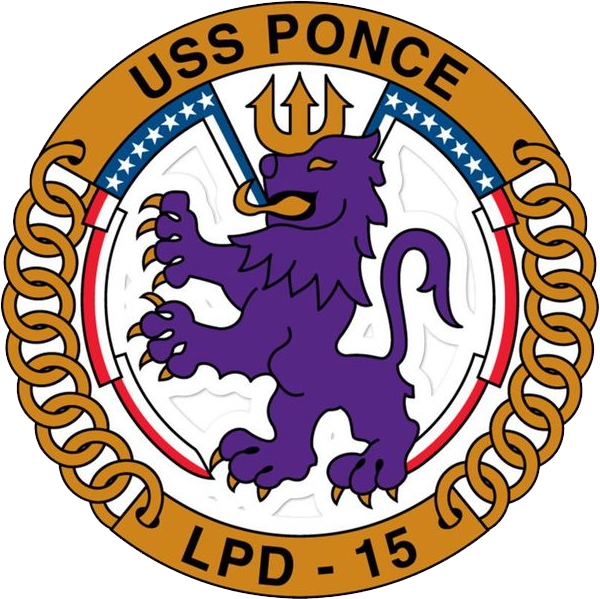
- Badge

General characteristics
- Class & type: Austin-class amphibious transport dock
- Displacement: 8883 tons light, 16591 tons full, 7708 tons dead
- Length: 173.7 m (570 ft) overall; 167 m (548 ft) waterline
- Beam: 30.4 m (100 ft) extreme; 25.6 m (84 ft) waterline
- Draft: 6.7 m (22 ft) maximum; 7 m (23 ft) limit
- Speed: 20 knots (37 km/h; 23 mph)
- Complement: 29 officers, 487 men
- Armament: 8 × 0.5 in (12.7 mm) caliber gun mounts; 2 × 20 mm Phalanx CIWS; 2 × 25 mm Mk 38 Mod 2; Laser Weapon System

USS Ponce (AFSB(I)-15), (formerly LPD-15) (/ˈpɒnseɪ/ PON-say), was an Austin-class amphibious transport dock, formerly in service with the United States Navy. Her keel was laid down on 31 October 1966 by the Lockheed Shipbuilding and Construction Company of Seattle, Washington. She was launched on 20 May 1970 sponsored by Florence W. Hyland, the wife of Admiral John J. Hyland, and commissioned on 10 July 1971. She spent most of her career based on the East Coast and operating in the Atlantic Ocean and Mediterranean Sea, serving in Operation Desert Shield and supporting US operations in the 2011 Libyan Civil War.

It was intended that the ship would be decommissioned in 2012, but she gained a reprieve to be converted at short notice into a testbed for the Afloat Forward Staging Base (AFSB) concept, in which she would act as a base for mine-sweeping MH-53E Sea Dragon helicopters in the Persian Gulf. Following the conversion, Ponce had been used to test other initiatives and technologies, such as the Laser Weapon System and operating US Army attack helicopters at sea. After the arrival of USS Lewis B. Puller as a permanent AFSB (later designated as Expeditionary Mobile Base (ESB)), Ponce was decommissioned in October 2017 after 46 years of service and 27 deployments.

== Ship history ==
=== 1980s ===
On 2 February 1982, during a towing exercise while en route to Portsmouth, England, Ponce collided with USS Fort Snelling, causing minor damage to Ponce's port side, mainly to the accommodation ladder and flight deck catwalk.

On 14 February 1984, while attempting to bring an assault craft into the welldeck, near Morehead City, North Carolina, Ponce suffered major damage when her stern gate was damaged and eventually lost. She was later repaired in Philadelphia. Following the stern gate repairs, Ponce resumed her deployment, successfully loading the Marines and equipment off North Carolina's shores and heading for the Mediterranean, where she served as part of a multinational peacekeeping force, patrolling the shore off Beirut, Lebanon in the wake of the attack on the Marine barracks the previous October.

=== 1990s ===
On 5 August 1990, as part of Operation Sharp Edge to remove US citizens caught up in the civil war in Liberia, Ponce, together with Saipan, Sumter, and Peterson, inserted a United States Marine Corps reinforced rifle company into the U.S. Embassy compound in Monrovia for increased security.

From June to December 1991, Ponce completed a six-month deployment to the Mediterranean Sea, and was part of Operation Desert Shield and supported Operation Desert Storm.

In the first half of 1992, Ponce completed a four-month maintenance availability in Norfolk, Virginia. In June, she took on midshipmen for a training cruise off the Virginia Capes, which earned her the "CORTRAMID '92 Surface Warrior of the Week". In September, she arrived in Miami for Hurricane Andrew relief efforts. In October, she commenced counter drug operations in the Caribbean with a United States Coast Guard Law Enforcement Detachment on board.

On 17 March 1993, Ponce departed on a six-month deployment to the Mediterranean Sea with the 26th Marine Expeditionary Unit in support of Operations "Deny Flight" and "Provide Promise". She was accompanied by USS Saipan and USS Pensacola. During the deployment, she operated bilaterally with Greek units in exercise "Alexandros '93" and conducted amphibious landing exercises with the Tunisians in "Phiblex '93".

In April, 1996, operating with elements of the 22d Marine Expeditionary Unit - Special Operations Capable [MEU (SOC)] and the USS Carter Hall (LSD-50), the Ponce sailed from North Carolina independent of the "big deck" (USS Kearsarge, LHD-3), that was operating off the west coast of Africa, in support of a Non-Combatant Operation (NEO). Along with the Carter Hall, the Ponce supported all 11 of the LF6F 2-97 tasking, including conducting embassy reinforcements during Operation Silver Wake in Albania, following unrest in the capital. Supporting 4 CH-46E Sea Knight and 2 UH-1 helicopters during the entire deployment, the Ponce entered the Black Sea through the Bosphorus Strait and conducted Exercise Cooperative Partner in Bulgaria, marking the first time a combined Navy-Marine Corps task force had operated in the former Soviet Bloc country. A second trip to the Black Sea saw the Ponce participate in Exercise Rescue Eagle in Romania and Exercise Sea Breeze in Ukraine. Following Exercise Dynamic Mix in Greece, Ponce and Carter Hall returned to the East Coast in October, 1996, concluding the entire deployment as a two-ship Amphibious Ready Group.

=== 2000s ===
On 27 April 2001, Ponce commenced a six-month deployment to the Mediterranean, returning to Norfolk on 15 October. On 29 August 2001, Ponce crewmembers boarded two derelict Italian boats, a 19-foot (5.8 m) motorboat and a 12-foot (3.7 m) sailboat, in the Straits of Messina between Sicily and Calabria. The civilian vessels were adrift, creating a navigational hazard. A boarding party in a rigid hull inflatable boat found both derelicts unmanned, though the motorboat was well stocked. They towed both boats back to Ponce, which flooded her welldeck, brought the boats aboard, carried them into Catania, and turned them over to the Guardia Costiera (Italian Coast Guard).

On 10 January 2003, Ponce received orders to depart Norfolk, Virginia and take on Marines from Camp Lejeune, North Carolina, for the 2003 invasion of Iraq. That duty kept Ponce at sea through February. At the end of February, she became the flagship of the Commander of Mine Countermeasure Squadron Three, designated as Commander, Task Group 55.4. The Task Group included a US Navy special clearance team, two explosive ordnance disposal (EOD) units, a detachment of MH-53E Sea Dragon helicopters from Helicopter Mine Countermeasures Squadron Fourteen (HM-14), a British unit and an Australian team. The ships involved included the coastal mine hunters Cardinal and Raven, mine countermeasure ships Ardent and Dextrous, and dock landing ship Gunston Hall.

USS Ponce aerials

After breaking the Squadron's pennant at her yardarm, the crews of Ponce and Gunston Hall enjoyed liberty ashore in Manama, Bahrain, from 28 February to 5 March. She then served as Task Group flagship for a weeks-long minesweeping operation in Iraq, as humanitarian aid was being blocked by naval mines in the Khawr Abd Allah river and the port of Umm Qasr. The Group used a variety of methods, including MH-53E Sea Dragon helicopters towing magnetic minesweeping sleds, trained marine mammals, unmanned underwater vehicles and EOD divers. On 28 March 2003, a 200-yard (180 m)-wide channel was declared safe, and the British auxiliary vessel RFA Sir Galahad docked at Umm Qasr Port and began offloading hundreds of tons of food and water. Work continued for weeks after that, widening the channel.

On 25 March 2005, Ponce again departed Norfolk, deploying with the Kearsarge Expeditionary Strike Group (ESG) for six months. Following a port visit to Augusta Bay, Sicily, Ponce spent three months in the Persian Gulf conducting operations in support of the global war on terrorism. While in the Persian Gulf, she made port visits to Bahrain and Jebel Ali in the United Arab Emirates. Ponce departed the Persian Gulf in August 2005. On 19 August, Ponce was in the Gulf of Aqaba awaiting the underway movement of USS Ashland to allow Ponce to dock pier side. While Ashland was in the process, the Katyusha rocket attack occurred on USS Kearsarge and Ashland. Ponce remained in the Gulf of Aqaba for over a week in response to the attack. She then conducted port visits to Malta and Rota, Spain, before returning to Norfolk on 27 September.

=== 2010s ===
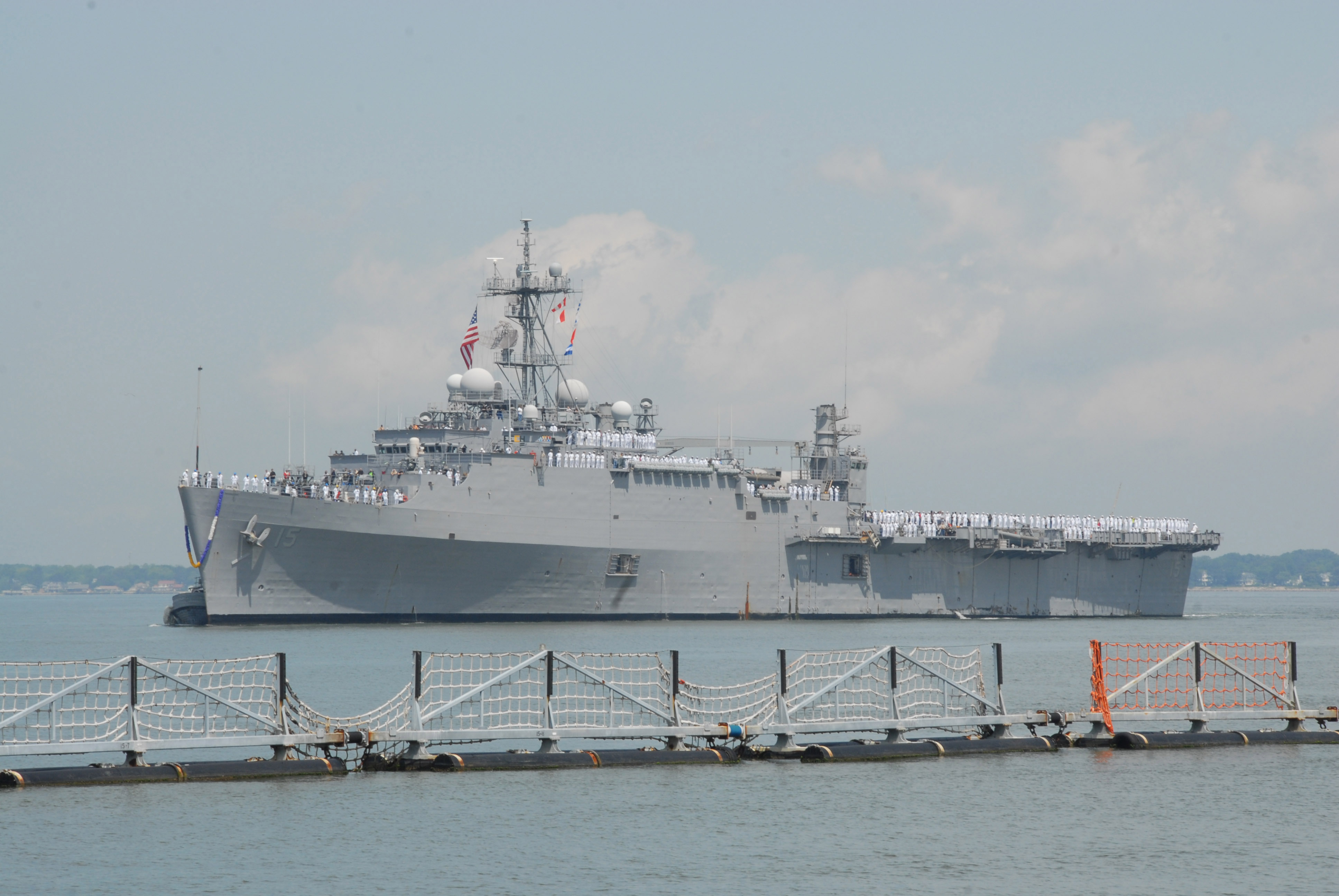
Ponce returns in May 2011 from her last major deployment as an LPD, during the Libyan civil war

On 2 March 2011, Ponce, along with Kearsarge, traveled through the Suez Canal in response to the 2011 Libyan civil war.

On 23 April 2011, Commander, U.S. Sixth Fleet (C6F) relieved Ponce's commanding and executive officers, as a result of a hazing inquiry. Vice Admiral Harry B. Harris Jr., relieved commanding officer (CO) Commander Etta Jones, due to a demonstration of poor leadership and failure to appropriately investigate, report, and hold accountable sailors found involved in hazing incidents. Additionally, she failed to properly handle a loaded weapon during a security alert, which endangered some of her ship's crew. The relief of the executive officer (XO), Lieutenant Commander Kurt Boenisch, was attributed to his failure to provide support to the command and to his commanding officer.

On 26 October 2011, Ponce began a three-week tour that would take her to Port Canaveral, Florida, the U.S. Virgin Islands, and her namesake city of Ponce, Puerto Rico. On her return to Norfolk, in December 2011, she was to begin the process of decommissioning. On 2 December 2011, Ponce came home to await decommissioning, scheduled for 30 March 2012, when she would be towed to the Philadelphia Naval Shipyard, and put in reserve status. In January 2012, in response to requests from United States Central Command, it was decided that she would be retrofitted and re-deployed as the first of a planned series of mine-countermeasures warships for use in keeping open strategic sea lanes.

=== Afloat Forward Staging Base, Interim (AFSB-I) ===
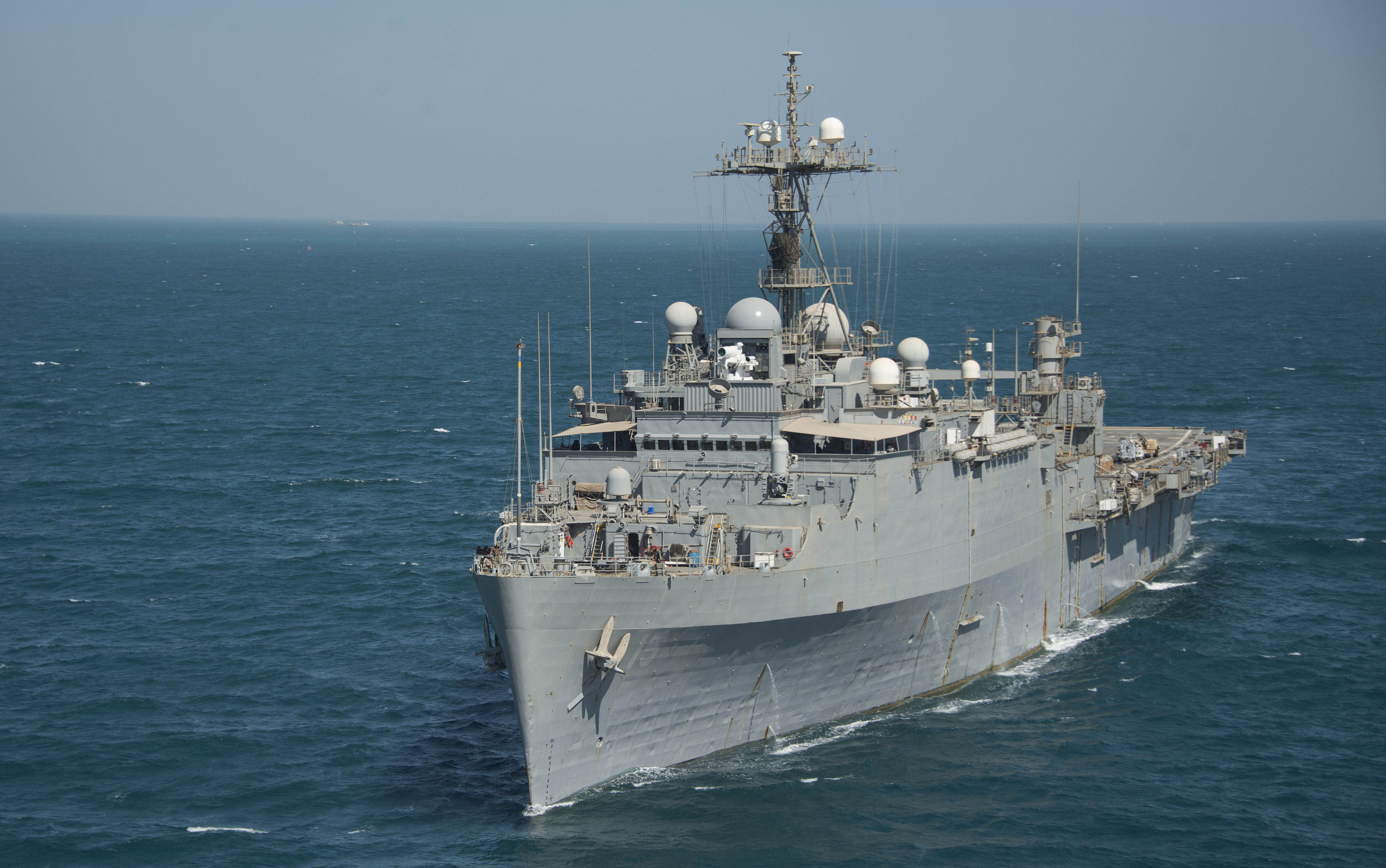
In September 2014 after conversion to AFSB

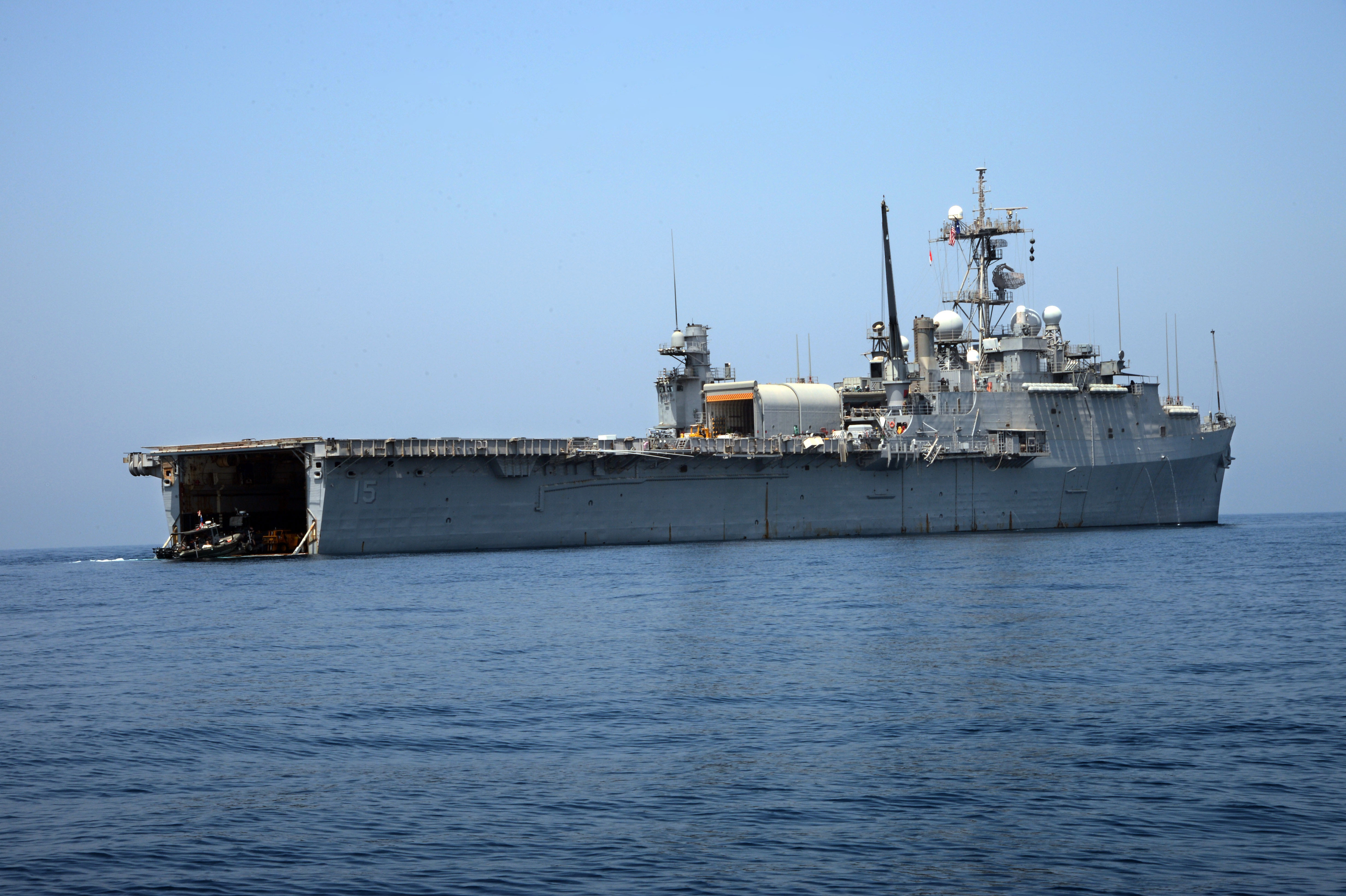
RHIB enters well-deck in 2012

On 24 January 2012, Military Sealift Command (MSC) posted a bid request to retrofit USS Ponce on a rush-order basis. MSC issued requests for proposal to upgrade and refit the ship. The work included upgrading the ship's navigation systems, bringing habitability up to MSC standards and general refurbishment. The ship was expected to be completely transformed in an estimated four to five months, and the target date for re-deployment to her new role was met.

Ponce was re-designated from LPD-15 to AFSB(I)-15 (Afloat Forward Staging Base and "I" for "interim", until purpose-built vessels came on line in 2015), and she was modified to support mine-sweeping MH-53 Sea Dragon helicopters and small mine-clearance vessels. The ship was operated jointly by active-duty Navy officers and sailors, as well as being crewed by government civilian mariners from Military Sealift Command, some of whom were more than 60 years old.

The ship served in the Persian Gulf as the Pentagon's first floating staging base for military operations or humanitarian assistance. It was later reported that, despite the capability to do so, Ponce would not be a mothership for special operations, but rather a "lilypad" for MH-53E helicopters in a mine-clearance role, as well as for patrol and mine-clearance craft. As Admiral John Harvey stated, "The topic was a hot one, and people read these [documents] we generate very closely. I think they put two and two together and got 22."

On 1 June 2012, Ponce, in her new role as AFSB, deployed to the Fifth Fleet area in the Middle East, and on 22 June 2012 she passed through the Suez Canal on her way to Bahrain, arriving there on 5 July. She then participated in International Mine Countermeasures Exercise 2012 (IMCMEX 2012) between 16 and 27 September 2012, demonstrating the capabilities her "stop-gap" role was intended to fill.

On 29 October 2012, Ponce rescued seven Bahraini fishermen whose vessel was foundering in a hailstorm.

In 2013, Ponce functioned as the operational center and HQ for the International Mine Countermeasures Exercise in the Persian Gulf, using the berthing designed for transporting marines in order to function as a floating "hotel" for the operation.

In October 2016, Ponce was subjected to missile fire ostensibly launched from Yemen by Houthi rebels.

In August 2017, Ponce was replaced in the AFSB role by Lewis B. Puller (ESB-3), and in mid-2017, both ships briefly operated together. With the role of AFSB permanently taken over, the ship returned to port at Norfolk, Virginia on 27 September 2017.

=== Laser weapon tests ===
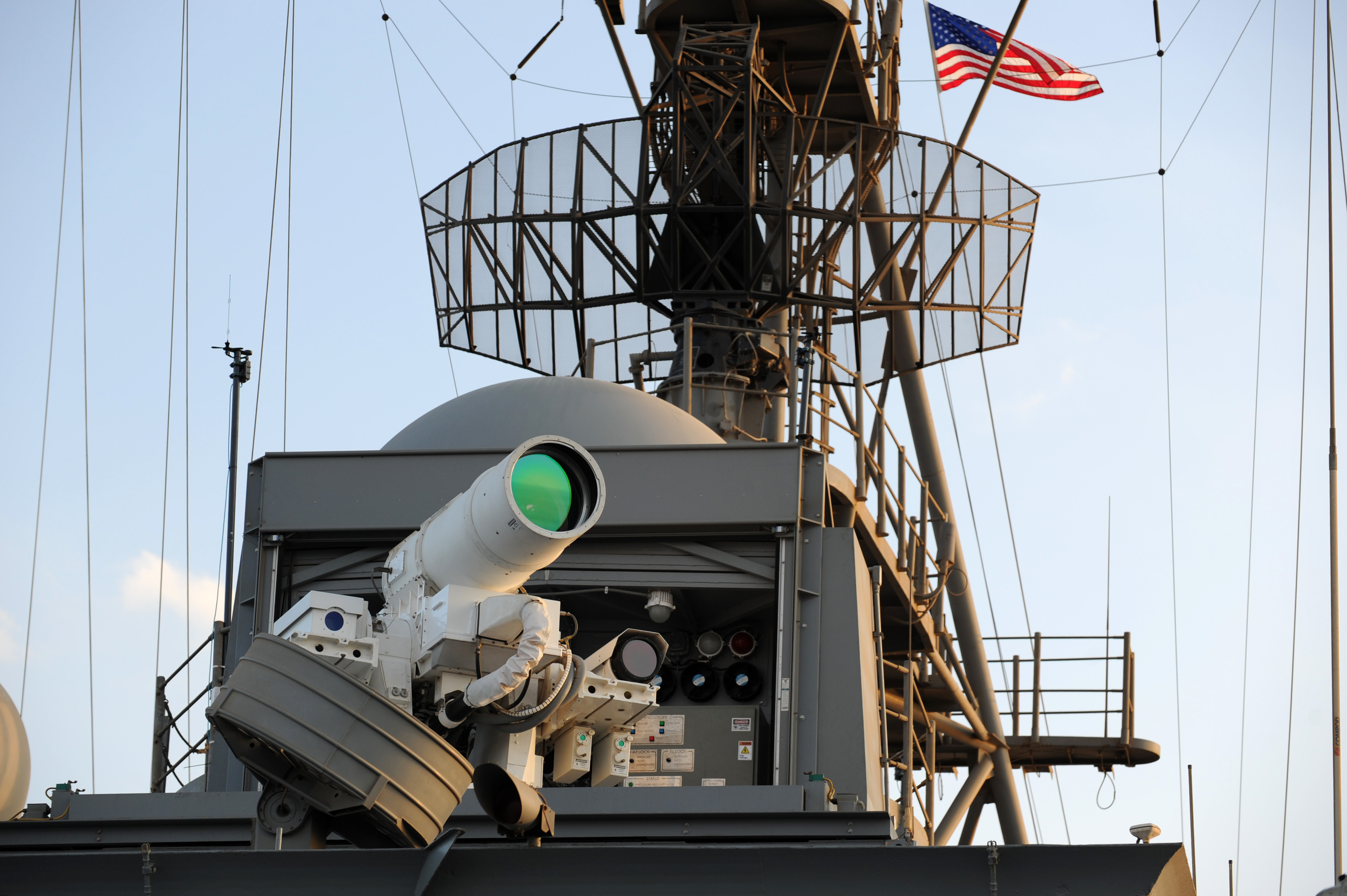
Laser Weapon System aboard USS Ponce (AFSB(I)-15) in November 2014 (05)

Ponce became the testbed platform for the AN/SEQ-3 Laser Weapon System (LaWS), with installation of a prototype weapon system for field testing in August 2014. In December 2014 the Navy reported the LaWS system worked perfectly, and that the commander of Ponce was authorized to use the system as a defensive weapon. On 9 December 2014, the Navy released video footage of the LaWS in operation, and while the operating power is unknown, it is estimated to be in the range of 15–50 Kilowatt (kW) for engaging drones, small aircraft and high-speed boats.

Ponce was deployed to the Persian Gulf with the laser in late August 2014, and the LaWS remained in use until 2017; at which point, Ponce was decommissioned and the LaWS was moved to USS Portland (LPD-27).

== Possible sale to Argentina ==
In 2017, it was reported that Argentina was interested in acquiring Ponce as an addition to their Navy. It was reported that talks of purchase began while US Vice President Mike Pence was on a state visit to Argentina and met with Argentine President, Mauricio Macri. Such a purchase would restore amphibious assault capability to the Argentine Navy, which it has not had since 1997, with the decommissioning of tank landing ship, ARA Cabo San Antonio. In response to these reports, the United Kingdom has expressed concern that said purchase would give Argentina a way to invade the Falkland Islands once again, and if purchased, the Royal Navy would have to increase its presence in the Falkland Islands. The Navy has since announced that Ponce will be dismantled following her decommissioning, likely negating any possibility of a sale.

== Decommissioning ==
Ponce was decommissioned at Naval Station Norfolk on 14 October 2017 and moved to the Naval Inactive Ship Maintenance Facility in Philadelphia, Pennsylvania, where it was laid up.

On 24 March 2022, Ponce was removed from the Philadelphia NISMF and began its journey to Brownsville, Texas, where it will be scrapped. It arrived in Brownsville on 12 April 2022.
