= Flag of Portland =

Flag of Portland may refer to:

- Flag of Portland, Oregon
- Flag of Portland, Maine

== See also ==
- Portland (disambiguation)
