= MV Al Marjan =

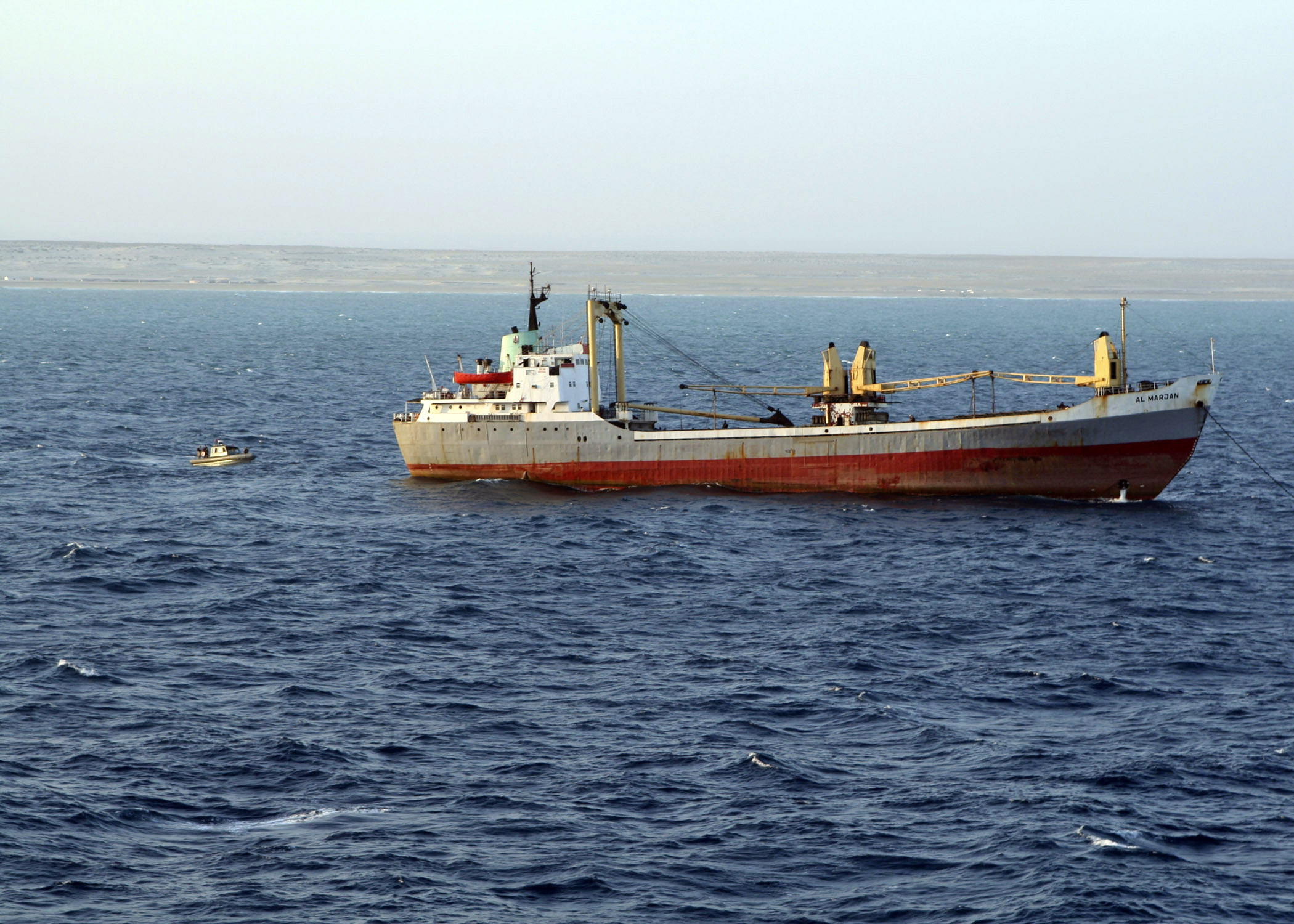
- MV al Marjan

History
- Name: al Marjan
- Owner: Shamir Marine, UAE
- Operator: Biyat International
- Port of registry: Comoros
- Route: Dubai to Mogadishu
- Builder: Robb Henry
- Launched: 1967
- Out of service: 2010
- Fate: Caught fire in Magadishu, 27 January 2010
- Notes: IMO number: 6717344

General characteristics
- Tonnage: 2850 dwt
- Crew: 22

MV al-Marjan was a cargo vessel active in the Horn of Africa. It was involved in relief efforts, and delivered food commodities from Dar es Salaam to Kismayu and Merca in March 2007.

== Capture by Pirates ==
The ship was hijacked by Somali pirates while on its way to Mogadishu from Dubai, 17 October 2007. It was released 2 December 2007 off the coast of Somalia, where it received assistance from the USS Whidbey Island.

== Fate ==
The vessel caught fire and burned in the port of Mogadishu, while smuggling charcoal from Somalia to Oman.
