= USS Portland =

Three ships of the United States Navy have borne the name USS Portland, named in honor of the cities of Portland, Maine, and Portland, Oregon.

- USS Portland (CA-33) was a Portland-class heavy cruiser, launched in 1932 and struck in 1959
- USS Portland (LSD-37) was an Anchorage-class dock landing ship, launched in 1969 and struck in 2004
- USS Portland (LPD-27) is a San Antonio-class amphibious transport dock launched 13 February 2016

== See also ==
- HMS Portland
