= Operation Sharp Edge =

1990–91 US evacuation effort from Liberia

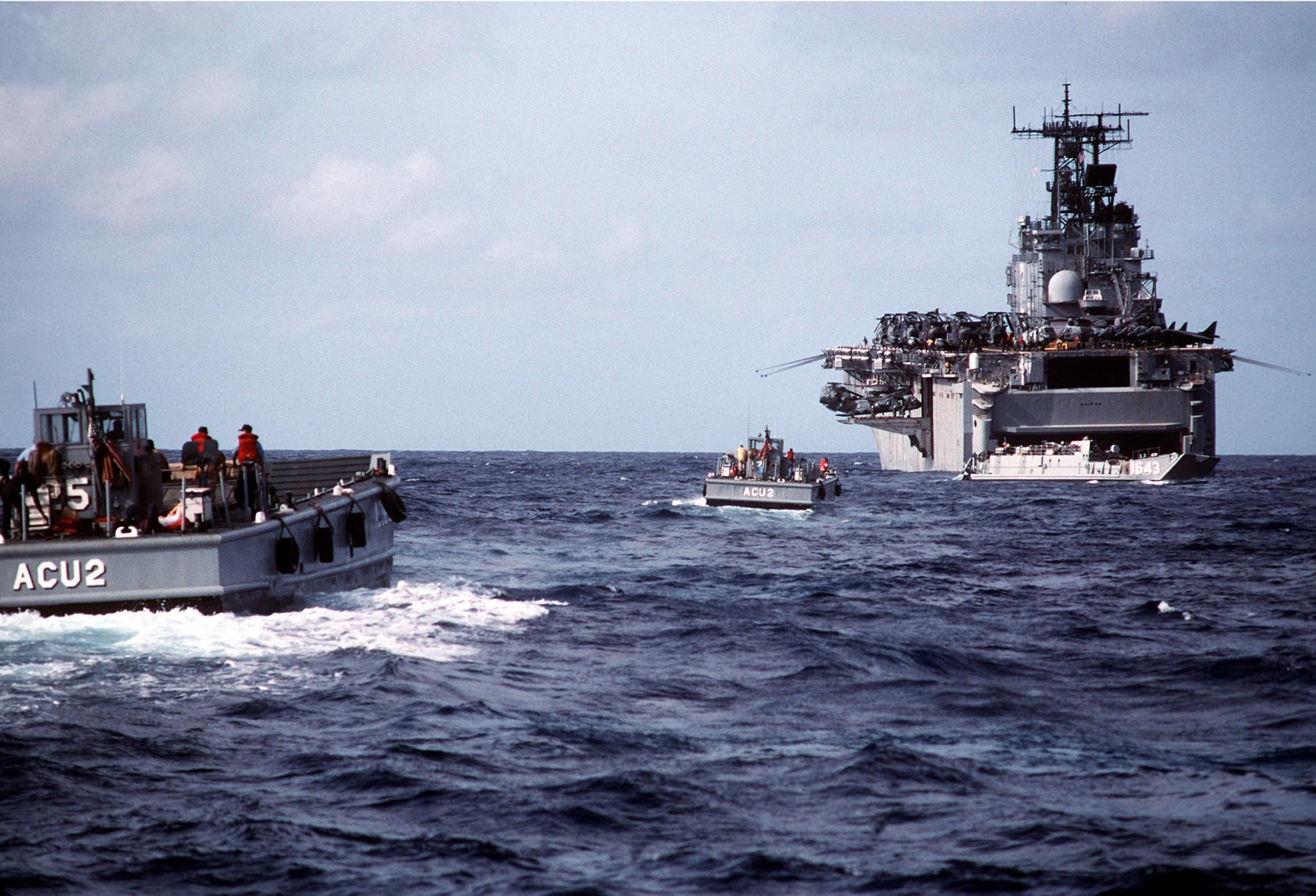
USS Saipan and landing craft during Operation Sharp Edge

Operation Sharp Edge was a non-combatant evacuation operation carried out by the 22nd Marine Expeditionary Unit (22nd MEU) and 26th MEU of the United States Marine Corps in Liberia in 1990 and 1991. The MEUs were supported by Amphibious Squadron Four (Task Force 61) composed of USS Whidbey Island, USS Saipan, USS Ponce, USS Sumter, USS Barnstable County, USS Peterson, and Fleet Surgical Team TWO.

== Background ==
The First Liberian Civil War broke out in December 1989. Increasing violence between political and ethnic factions, including in the capital of Monrovia, had made it impossible for American diplomats and civilians to make safe passage to the U.S. Embassy to exit the country.

== Operation ==
The 22nd MEU was composed of Battalion Landing Team (BLT) 2nd Battalion 4th Marines (ground combat element), HMM-261 (REIN) (aviation combat element) and MSSG-22 (logistics combat element).

Company "E" of the 2nd Battalion, 4th Marines executed a pre-dawn vertical envelopment of the besieged U.S. Embassy, with 237 Marines inserted via medium and heavy lift Marine Sikorsky CH-53D Sea Stallion and CH-46 Sea Knight helicopters. The landing zones were under sporadic fire from light, medium and heavy weapons from belligerents. "Hotel" Company secured an extended perimeter around the U.S. Embassy and began evacuation of other allied embassies. Ground elements were supported by U.S. Marine AH-1T SuperCobra helicopters and Marine AV-8B Harrier II attack aircraft. Simultaneously, elements of BLT 2/4 secured landing zones in the surrounding areas, extracting U.S. and foreign nationals. Non-combatants were flown off to USS Saipan and USS Ponce for processing and ultimately Freetown, Sierra Leone. Although BLT 2/4 conducted the initial entry into the embassy, the Marines of BLT 3/8 with 26th MEU arrived on station and continued with the evacuation operations as the 22nd MEU began its retrograde and departure.

Following the initial 20 August 1990 evacuation by the 22nd MEU and her support elements, the MEU was relieved by the Company "K" and a detachment of Headquarters and Support (H&S) personnel of the 3rd Battalion, 8th Marine Regiment (designated as Battalion Landing Team 3/8), a part of the 26th MEU 26th Marine Expeditionary Unit embarked on USS Whidbey Island. Also present were Assault Craft Unit 4 Detachment B, embarked service support group elements from the MEU command element, as well as USS Barnstable County, which was used to ferry evacuees out of Monrovia. Remaining on station for the next 121 days, the Marines and sailors of Whidbey Island evacuated over 1,000 civilian personnel from Monrovia, most of whom were subsequently transported to Freetown, Sierra Leone aboard the accompanying USS Barnstable County. The 26th MEU was relieved by FAST Company 5th Platoon of the Marine Corps circa December, 1990, when Whidbey Island and her embarked troops steamed to the Mediterranean in anticipated support of the growing Operation Desert Shield. 26 MEU and 22 MEU evacuated a total of 2,439 people between the summer of 1990 and 9 January 1991.
