= USS Whidbey Island =

United States Navy ship

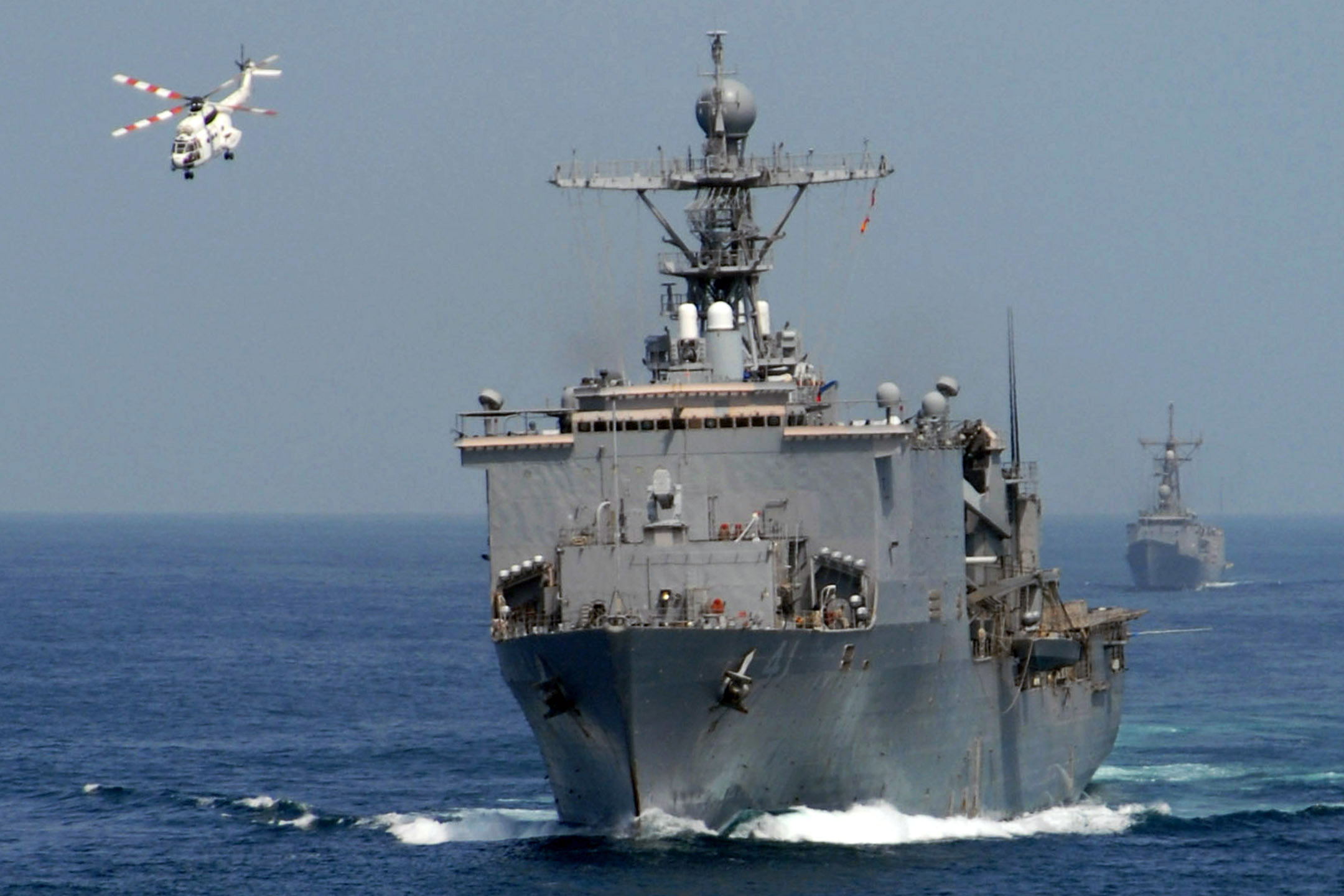
- USS Whidbey Island (LSD-41) in the Persian Gulf in 2006

History

United States
- Name: Whidbey Island
- Namesake: Whidbey Island
- Ordered: 9 February 1981
- Laid down: 4 August 1981
- Launched: 10 June 1983
- Acquired: 8 January 1985
- Commissioned: 9 February 1985
- Decommissioned: 22 July 2022
- Identification: Hull number: LSD-41; Callsign: NNWI
- Motto: Intrepid Vanguard
- Fate: Out of commission, Being Towed for Scrap as of 1/13/2026
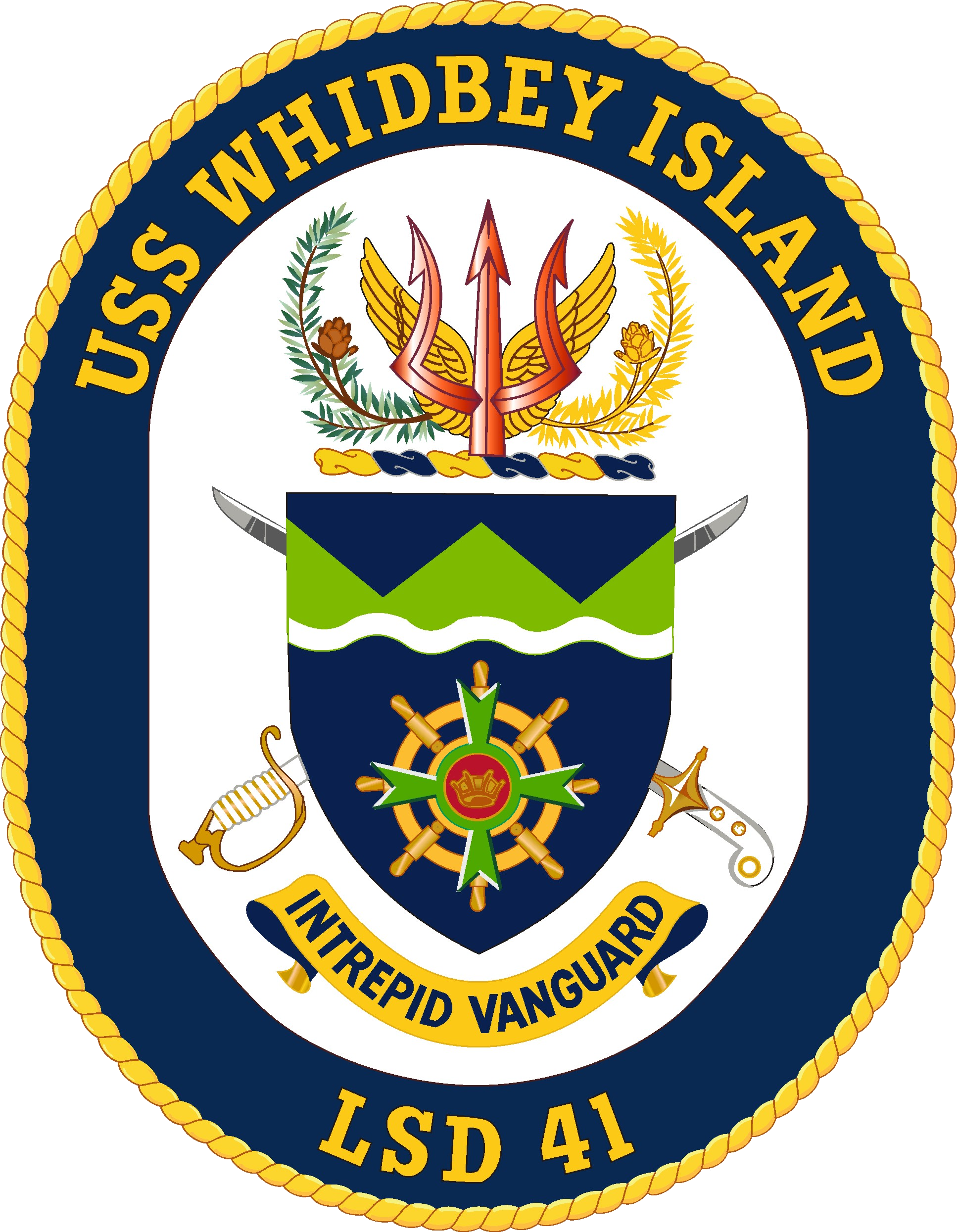
- Badge

General characteristics
- Class & type: Whidbey Island-class dock landing ship
- Displacement: 11,471 tons (light); 16,360 tons (full)
- Length: 610 ft (190 m)
- Beam: 84 ft (26 m)
- Draft: 21 ft (6.4 m)
- Propulsion: 4 Colt Industries, 16-cylinder diesel engines, 2 shafts, 33,000 shp (25,000 kW)
- Speed: over 20 knots (37 km/h; 23 mph)
- Boats & landing craft carried: 3 LCUs, 4LCACs or 21 LCM-6s
- Complement: 22 officers, 391 enlisted; Marine detachment: 402 + 102 surge
- Armament: 2 × 25 mm Mk 38 cannons; 2 × 20 mm Phalanx CIWS mounts; 2 × Rolling Airframe Missile; 6 × 0.5 in (12.7 mm) M2HB machine guns

USS Whidbey Island (LSD-41) was a Whidbey Island-class dock landing ship (LSD) of the United States Navy. She was named for Whidbey Island, in Puget Sound, Washington, the location of NAS Whidbey Island; the name ultimately derives from the sailor, explorer and engineer Joseph Whidbey.

Whidbey Island was laid down on 4 August 1981, by the Lockheed Shipbuilding, Seattle, Washington; launched on 10 June 1983, sponsored by Mrs. Sally Gorton, wife of Senator Slade Gorton; and commissioned on 9 February 1985.

== History ==
In February 1981, the U.S. Navy awarded Lockheed Shipbuilding Company of Seattle, Washington, a contract to construct LSD-41, first of a new Dock Landing Ship class to replace the aging Thomaston-class LSDs. At the 4 August 1981 keel laying ceremony, the Honorable John F. Lehman, Secretary of the Navy, affixed his signature to the LSD-41 keel; the first keel of an amphibious assault ship lain in more than five years.

Although the first ship to carry the name Whidbey Island, there was at one time a ship named USS Whidbey (AG-141), a small transport purchased from the U.S. Army and servicing U.S. Trust Territories in the late 1940s.

Whidbey Island, the first ship in a class designed specifically to interface with the Landing Craft Air Cushion (LCAC), assisted in the operational and developmental testing of the amphibious assault craft from July to September 1985 and again in May and July 1986.

=== 1986 – 1991 ===
In August 1986, Whidbey Island embarked on her first major operation, participating in the NATO Exercise Northern Wedding/Bold Guard '86.

Whidbey Island's first deployment was to the Mediterranean in January 1987. The ship took part in seven amphibious exercises carrying out duties as Presidential Support Ship for the World Economic Summit in Venice, Italy, May 1987.

Whidbey Island deployed to the Mediterranean for the second time in December 1988 with MARG 1-89, participating in three major landing exercises with the Spanish, French and Italian navies before returning to homeport in June 1989. Whidbey Island was the first amphibious ship from the East Coast to deploy to the European Theater with LCACs. In September and October 1989, Whidbey Island participated in Hurricane Hugo disaster relief operations in the Caribbean.

In August 1990, Whidbey Island again deployed to the Mediterranean as part of MARG 3-90. During the trans-Atlantic crossing, the ship received orders to sail to Mamba Station off the coast of Monrovia, Liberia, serving as the flagship for evacuation operations in Operation Sharp Edge, spending 105 consecutive days at sea. By the time Whidbey Island reached her first port, Las Palmas, Canary Islands, the ship had been out to sea for 126 straight days. After further steaming around the Western Mediterranean in support of Operation Desert Storm, Whidbey Island returned to homeport March 1991 from her extended seven-month deployment.

=== 1992 – 1997 ===
On 5 December 1991 Whidbey Island deployed with MARG 1-92 representing the Amphibious Ready Group's operations in the Black Sea with a series of port calls. With members of the Sixth Fleet, the USS Inchon Band, and representatives from the other MARG ships, Whidbey Island made port calls to Samsun, Turkey; Constanţa, Romania; and Burgas, Bulgaria, becoming the first United States amphibious ship and the largest U.S. warship to operate in the Black Sea, the first U.S. Navy ship to visit Samsun in 70 years and the first U.S. Navy ship to ever visit Burgas. Whidbey Island returned to homeport on 5 June 1992.

In January 1993, Whidbey Island deployed in support of Operation Sea Signal/Able Manner, enforcing alien migration policies off the coast of Haiti.

Later that year, Whidbey Island deployed to the littorals of South America and West Africa during UNITAS 34-93/WATC 93, the first Whidbey Island-class ship to deploy to this region, leading the southernmost amphibious exercise ever at Tierra del Fuego, returning from deployment 17 December 1993.

In August 1994, in a Combined Joint Task Force Whidbey Island provided emergent lift services for the evacuation of 160 migrant camps from Grand Turk Island. Shortly after, Whidbey Island rescued and transported over 8,100 Cuban migrants from the Straits of Florida during Operation Able Vigil and participated in the restoration of the legitimate government to Haiti during Operation Uphold Democracy.

At the turn of 1995, Whidbey Island along with Wasp and Shreveport participated in NATO cold weather training in the North Atlantic for Exercise Strong Resolve 95. On 28 August 1995, Whidbey Island deployed for a fifth Mediterranean Deployment with the 26th Marine Expeditionary Unit (MEU). During this deployment, the ship participated in Exercises Atlas Hinge, Odysseus 95, Noble Shirley, Bright Star and Alexander the Great, spending over three months in the Adriatic Sea in support of peacekeeping operations for the Dayton Peace Accords in the former Yugoslavia. The crew received the Armed Forces Service Medal and the NATO Medal, returning to homeport 29 February 1996.

On 3 June 1996, Whidbey Island entered Norfolk Shipbuilding and Drydock Company (NORSHIPCO) for a Dry-docking Phased Maintenance Availability (DPMA) and received a Women at Sea Certification. On 1 July 1997, Whidbey Island departed for Unitas 38-97 setting a record for amphibious landings with several UNITAS participating nations before returning home 13 December 1997.

=== 1999 – 2002 ===
Whidbey Island departed for her sixth Mediterranean deployment 15 September 1999. Along with 22nd Marine Expeditionary Unit, Whidbey Island participated in Exercises Bright Star, Noble Shirley and Infinite Moonlight. During these exercises the ship worked in partnership with members of the British, Egyptian and Jordanian Armed Forces. Whidbey Island safely transited the Suez Canal as well as the Straits of Tiran, Toranto, Gibraltar, and of Messina, visiting ports such as Alicante, Spain; Antalya, Turkey; Haifa, Israel; Palermo, Italy; Genoa, Italy; Souda Bay, Greece; and Aqaba, Jordan.

On 24 May 2000, Whidbey Island returned to NORSHIPCO for multiple upgrades and additions to the ship's configuration and systems. During this PMA period the ship received two Rolling Airframe Missiles (RAM) Launchers as well as the Ship's Self Defense System (SSDS) Mk-1, significantly enhancing Whidbey Island's ability to track, engage and destroy incoming missiles at close range.

On 11 June 2001, Whidbey Island completed her Basic Phase of Training and started a five-week pre-deployment maintenance period. Starting 11 July 2001 the ship began her intermediate training cycle in preparation for deployment as part of Amphibious Squadron 8, Amphibious Ready Group.

On 19 September 2001, eight days after the terrorist attacks on the Pentagon and the World Trade Center, Whidbey Island weighed anchor for her seventh deployment. With troops of 26th MEU (Special Operations Capable), the ship participated in Exercise Bright Star off the coast of Egypt. At the completion of the exercise, crew and troops enjoyed a few days in the port of Marmaris, Turkey, before transiting the Suez Canal en route to the North Persian Gulf. While there, Whidbey Island spent 123 consecutive days on station in support of Operation Enduring Freedom. During this operation, 26th MEU set the record for conducting the longest amphibious operation ever (distance-wise)—nearly 700 nautical miles (1300 km) inland.

While deployed, Whidbey Island's crew visited Jebel Ali, United Arab Emirates; Split, Croatia; and Rota, Spain. The ship also participated in the National Training Continuum, Operations Noble Eagle, Operation Enduring Freedom and Operation Swift Freedom.

=== 2006 – 2007 ===
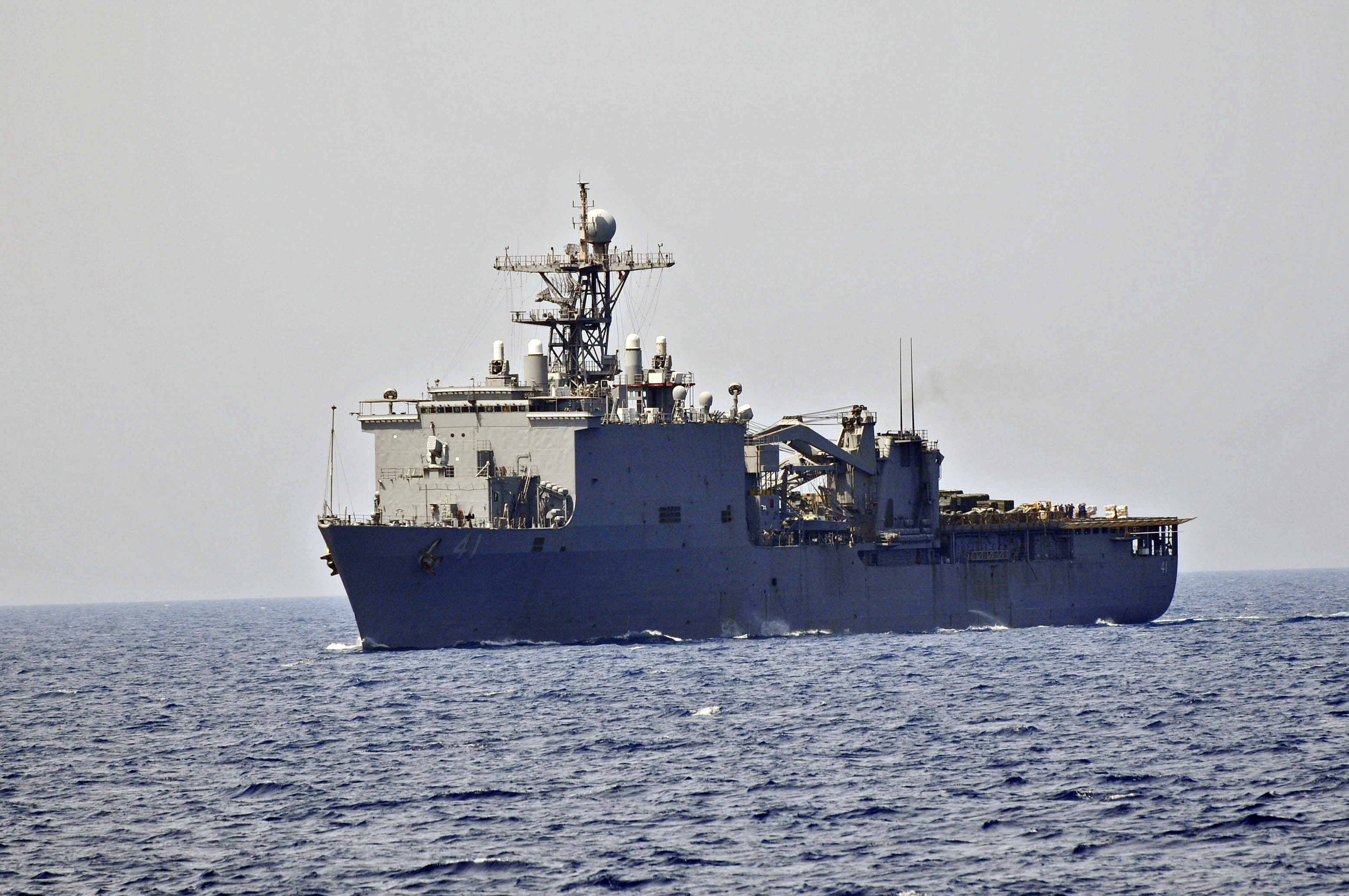
Whidbey Island underway in the Mediterranean Sea, 2 June 2011

In June 2006, Whidbey Island deployed in support of Operation Enduring Freedom. While in port Aqaba, Jordan in July 2006, she was recalled through the Suez Canal to support contingency operations due to the crisis in Lebanon. Whidbey Island subsequently participated in the largest Non-Combatant Evacuation conducted by the U.S. Navy since Vietnam. During July and August, she evacuated 817 American citizens, out of a total of 14,555 evacuated by the Iwo Jima Expeditionary Strike Group, via Landing Craft Air Cushion (LCAC) with Personnel Transport Module. AMCITS were taken to Limassol, Cyprus and released to State Department Control. Following operations off of Lebanon, Whidbey Island redeployed through the Suez Canal to the Fifth Fleet Operations Area and offloaded elements of the 24 MEU into Bahrain for operations in Iraq. Following the offload, Whidbey Island deployed to the Northern Persian Gulf in support of Commander Task Force 158, responsible as an Afloat Forward Staging Base. In this role, she was responsible for defense of the KAAOT and ABOT oil rigs, the primary critical oil infrastructure producing revenue for Iraq. In November 2006, Whidbey Island departed the Northern Persian Gulf and returned home, stopping in Civitavecchia, Italy and Tunis, Tunisia en route, arriving 6 December 2006.

On 16 February 2007, Whidbey Island was awarded the 2006 Battle "E" award.

On 1 October 2007, Whidbey Island deployed from Little Creek Naval Amphibious Base. After being deployed to the Horn of Africa, she assisted the Comorian vessel MV Al Marjan and her crew when they were released by Somali pirates on 2 December 2007.

=== 2008 – 2009 ===
On 12 January 2008, the US Navy reported that Whidbey Island had fired warning shots near a small Iranian boat in the Strait of Hormuz in December. The boat was reportedly approaching Whidbey Island rapidly but stopped after the warning shots were fired.

=== 2011 – 2012 ===
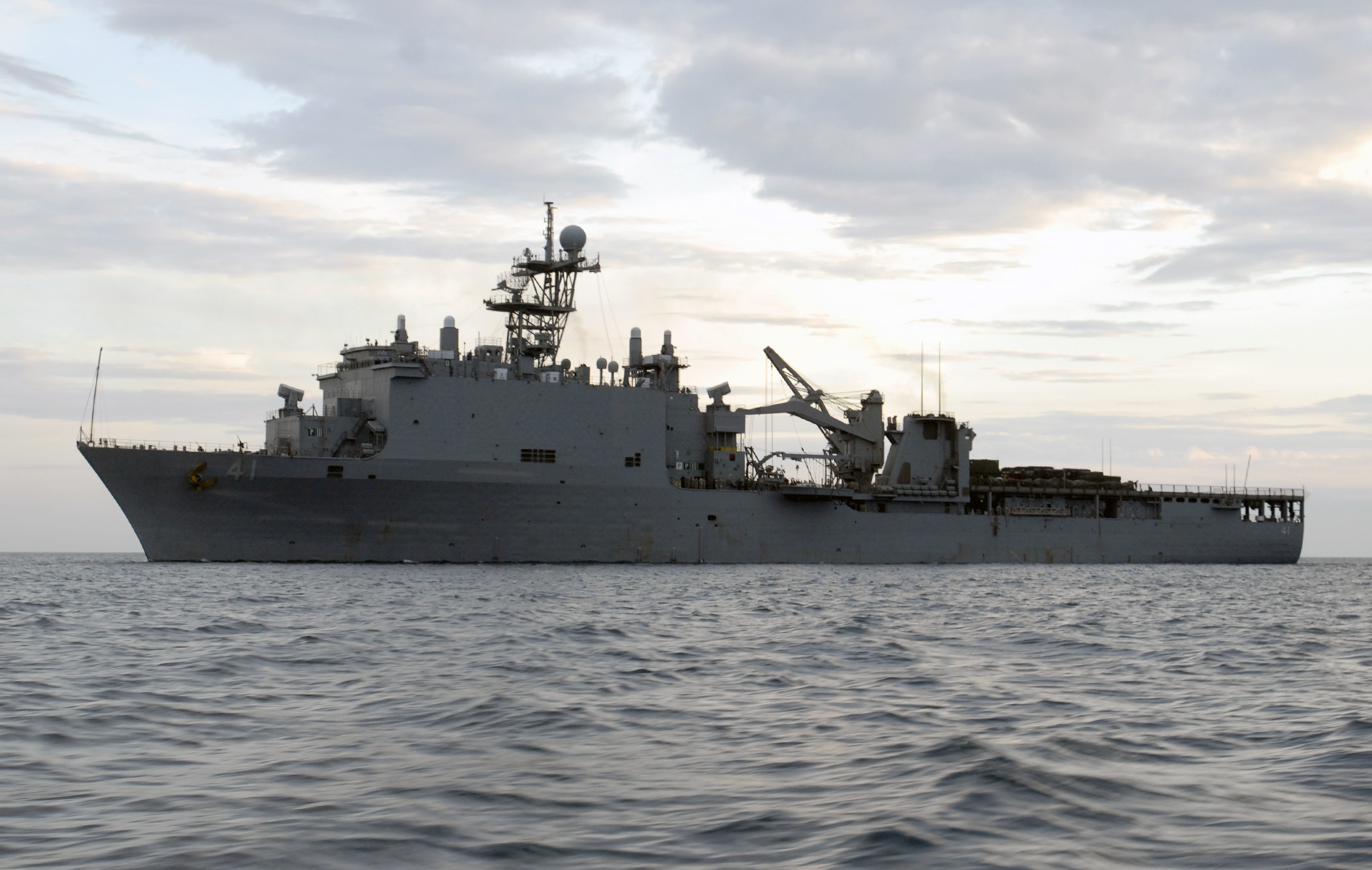
Whidbey Island off the coast of Romania, 2 August 2011

On 23 March 2011, Whidbey Island deployed as part of the Bataan Amphibious Ready Group with the 22nd Marine Expeditionary Unit. Whidbey Island had 11 port visits in eight different countries throughout the 5th and 6th Fleet areas of responsibility. Sailors and Marines participated in Operation Summer Storm 2011 off the coast of Romania from 30 July - 3 August. The 22nd Marine Expeditionary Unit disembarked 4 February 2012 in Morehead City, North Carolina. Whidbey Island returned to her homeport at Joint Expeditionary Base Little Creek-Fort Story in Virginia Beach, Virginia on 7 February 2012, concluding the 10 1/2 month deployment.

=== 2016 ===
On 24 June 2016, Whidbey Island deployed from Little Creek Naval Amphibious Base, on what would likely be her final deployment. She conducted eight Theater Security Port Visits; country visits vital to reassuring host nations of the commitment of the United States to their partnership. On 21 July 2016 Whidbey Island transited the Bosphorus Strait during a time of tension following the failed 2016 Turkish coup d'état attempt.

=== 2020 ===
In December 2020 the U.S. Navy's Report to Congress on the Annual Long-Range Plan for Construction of Naval Vessels stated that the ship was planned to be placed Out of Commission in Reserve in 2022.

=== 2022 ===
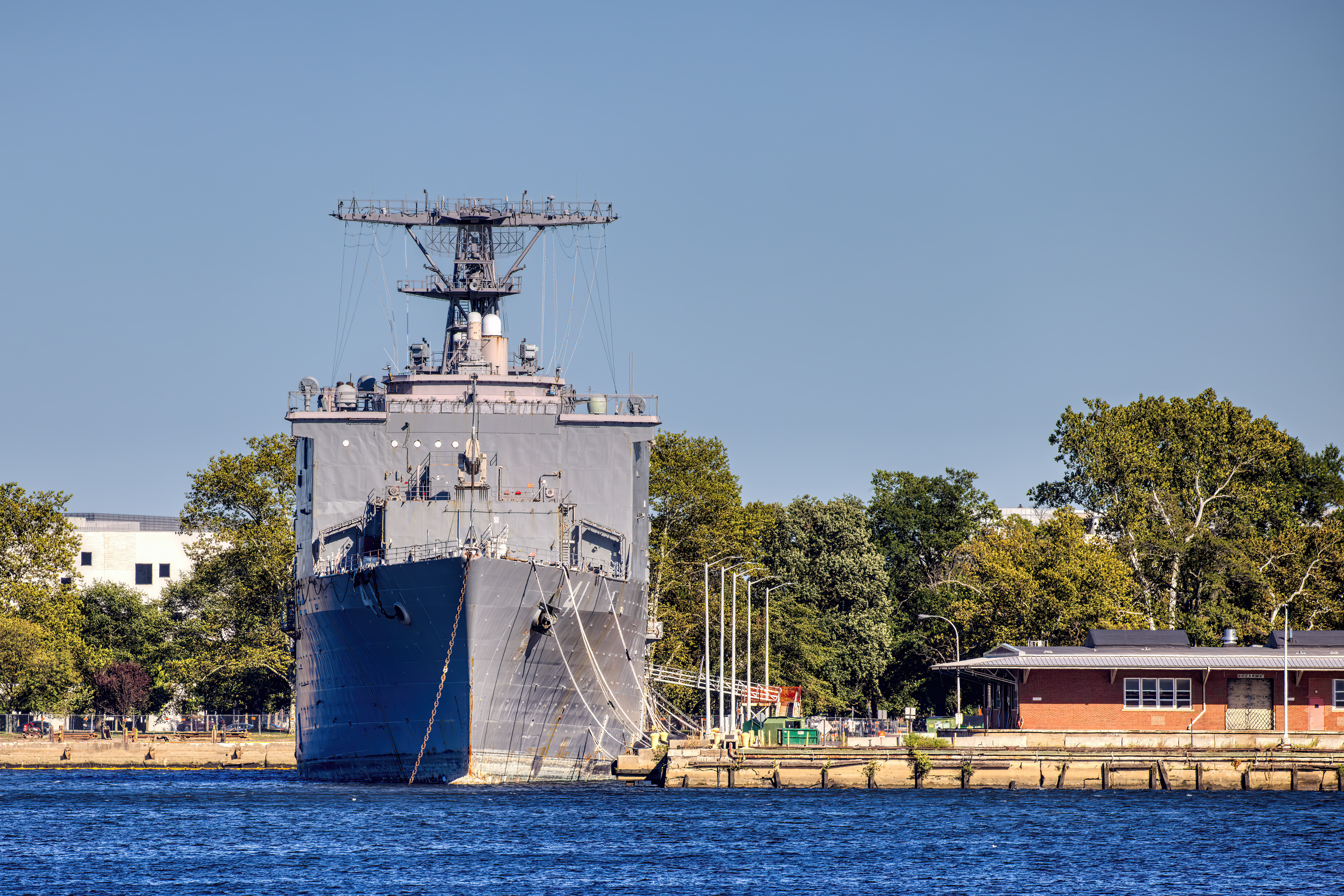
Whidbey Island moored at the Naval Inactive Ship Maintenance Facility in Philadelphia

Whidbey Island was decommissioned during a ceremony at Joint Expeditionary Base Little Creek-Fort Story in Virginia Beach, Virginia on 22 July 2022. She was towed to the Naval Inactive Ship Maintenance Facility in Philadelphia, Pennsylvania, by the USNS Apache (T-ATF-172) in August 2022.

=== Fate ===
On 13 January 2026, ex-Whidbey Island was towed to scrap.

== Ship's coat of arms ==
The dark blue and white colors refer to the sea, with the angular green area, representing the evergreen terrain of Whidbey Island, backed by blue sky. The color gold is symbolic of excellence, and the ship's wheel of gold reflects the seagoing pride and professionalism of the ship's crew. The green Maltese Cross refers to the humanitarian mission of the USS Whidbey (AG 141), the first ship to carry the name Whidbey. The gold crown emblazoned on red at the center of the wheel recalls the expedition under the British Crown, which explored the Pacific Northwest in the 1790s. The island in these waters is named for Lieutenant Joseph Whidbey, who was a member of this English expedition. The crossed swords of the Navy and Marine Corps officers attest to the Navy Marine Corps teamwork and leadership that are the foundation and key elements for accomplishment of Whidbey Island's amphibious warfare mission. The trident is the traditional symbol of sea power; however, the winged trident of LSD-41 further represents the revolutionary dimension of amphibious warfare this ship introduces. The gold and red colors of the winged trident portray the excellence and courage of those who will man the ship. The wreath of Western Hemlock, the State Tree of Washington, represents the spirit of the ship's namesake.
