= French ship Auguste (1741) =

History

France
- Name: Auguste
- Laid down: 1739
- Launched: January 1741
- In service: May 1741
- Captured: 9 February 1746

History

United Kingdom
- Name: HMS Portland's Prize
- Acquired: 9 February 1746
- Fate: Broken up in 1749

General characteristics
- Type: 50-gun ship of the line
- Displacement: 1277 tonneaux
- Tons burthen: 650 port tonneaux
- Length: 41.9 metres
- Beam: 11.2 metres
- Draught: 5 metres
- Sail plan: Full-rigged ship
- Armament: 50 guns

Auguste was a 50-gun ship of the line of the French Navy. Captured by HMS Portland on 9 February 1746 during the War of the Austrian Succession, she was taken into Royal Navy service as HMS Portland's Prize.
