= USS Saipan (LHA-2) =

Amphibious assault ship of the U.S. Navy

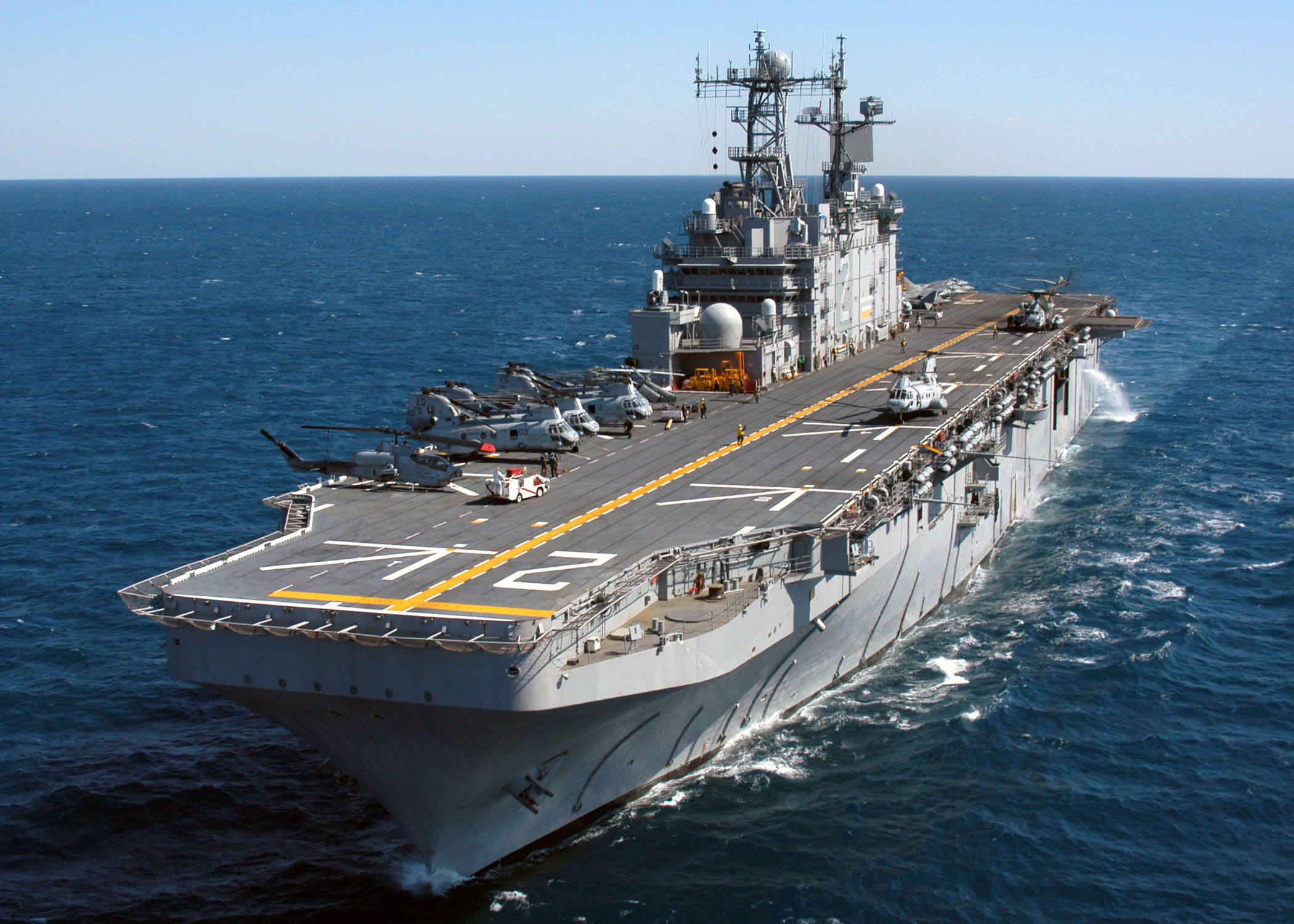
- USS Saipan underway on 5 April 2004

History

United States
- Name: Saipan
- Namesake: USS Saipan (CVL-48)
- Builder: Ingalls Shipbuilding
- Laid down: 21 July 1972
- Launched: 20 July 1974
- Commissioned: 15 October 1977
- Decommissioned: 25 April 2007
- Identification: Callsign: NHOV; Hull number: LHA-2
- Motto: Omnia Facimus; (We do it all)
- Fate: Scrapped, 2009
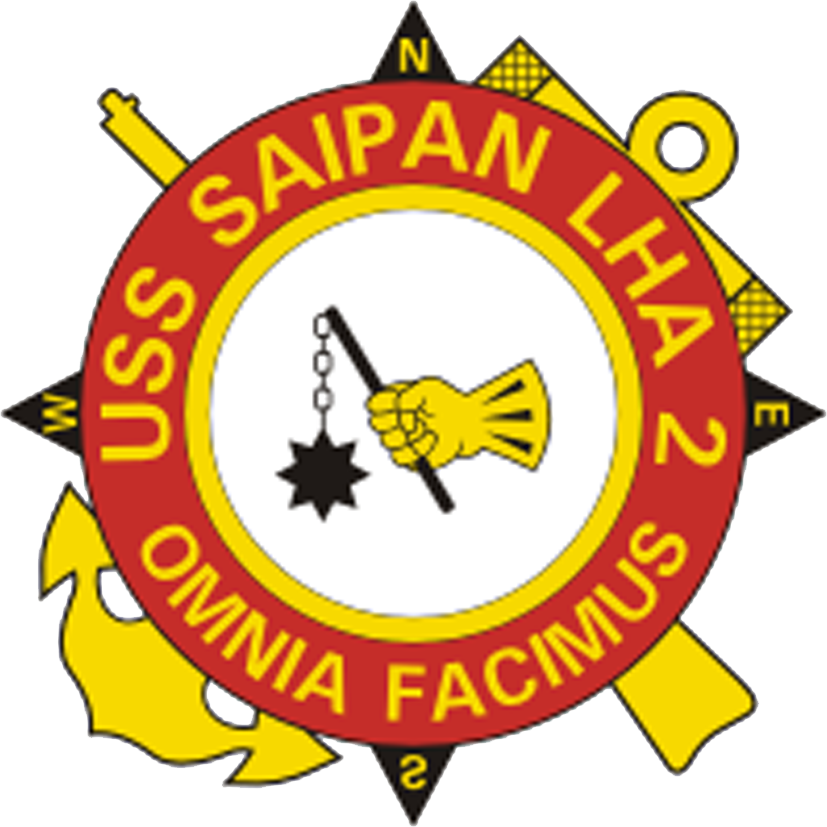
- Badge

General characteristics
- Class & type: Tarawa-class amphibious assault ship
- Displacement: 27,165 tons (27,601 t)
- Length: 820 ft (250 m)
- Beam: 106 ft (32 m)
- Draft: 26 ft (7.9 m)
- Propulsion: 2 × 600 psi combustion engineering boilers; 2 × geared steam turbines; 60,000 shp (45,000 kW)
- Speed: Over 20 knots (37 km/h; 23 mph)
- Troops: Marine detachment: 125 officers, 1,730 enlisted
- Complement: 65 officers, 1,009 enlisted
- Armament: 2 × RAM launchers; 2 × Mk 15 Phalanx CIWS; 3 × .50-caliber M2HB machine gun; 6 × Mk 38 25 mm cannons

USS Saipan (LHA-2) was a Tarawa-class amphibious assault ship, the second United States Navy ship named in honor of the World War II Battle of Saipan. Commissioned in 1977, the ship saw service until 2007 when she was decommissioned. In 2009 the ship was sold for scrapping.

== History ==
Saipan was laid down on 21 July 1972 by the Ingalls Shipbuilding Division, Litton Industries of Pascagoula, Mississippi; launched on 20 July 1974 and sponsored by the wife of Secretary of the Navy J. William Middendorf.

Saipan's operational career began in July 1979 when she was diverted from Fleet Refresher Training to Special Contingency Operations, for possible non-combatant evacuation of American personnel from the Nicaraguan Revolution.

=== 1980s ===
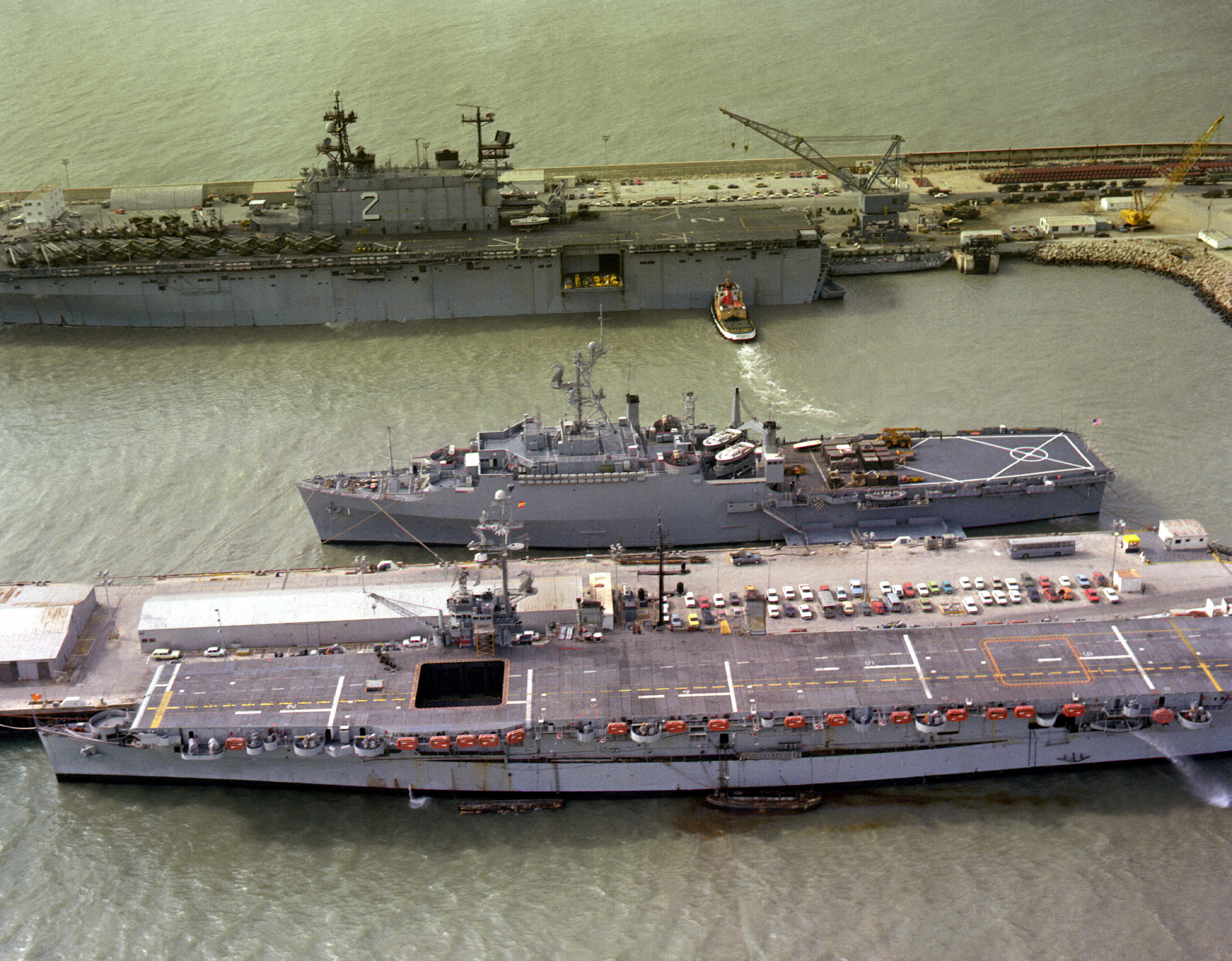
USS Saipan moored at Naval Station Rota (Spain) in February 1982 along with the USS Raleigh and Spanish carrier Dédalo

From February to April 1980, Saipan was involved in Anorak Express 80. The Navy crew of around 800 and an entire Marine battalion of over 2,000 sailed from Norfolk to Norway. In May, Saipan was underway to augment U.S. Coast Guard efforts to assist Cuban refugees crossing the Straits of Florida to the United States during the Mariel boatlift. On 25 August, Saipan departed Norfolk for the first Mediterranean deployment by an LHA.

On 3 September 1981, Saipan deployed for her second tour in the Mediterranean Sea. During that deployment, Saipan visited or operated in seven countries on three continents.

From August 1982 through July 1983, Saipan was in the Norfolk Naval Shipyard for her first scheduled complex overhaul. In September 1983, while undergoing Refresher Training at Guantanamo Bay, Cuba, Saipan was diverted to participate in Operation Urgent Fury off Grenada. In 1984 Saipan on another North Atlantic deployment.

In January 1985, Saipan departed for her third Mediterranean deployment. She steamed more than 32,000 miles (51,000 km), logged over 6,700 safe aircraft landings and visited ports in three countries.

Following a four-month restricted availability in Norfolk Naval Shipyard, Saipan sailed to Guantanamo Bay to complete various training evolutions.

On 17 August 1986, Saipan departed on its fourth Mediterranean deployment. Extended briefly in the Eastern Mediterranean for contingency operations, Saipan returned to Norfolk on 24 February 1987.

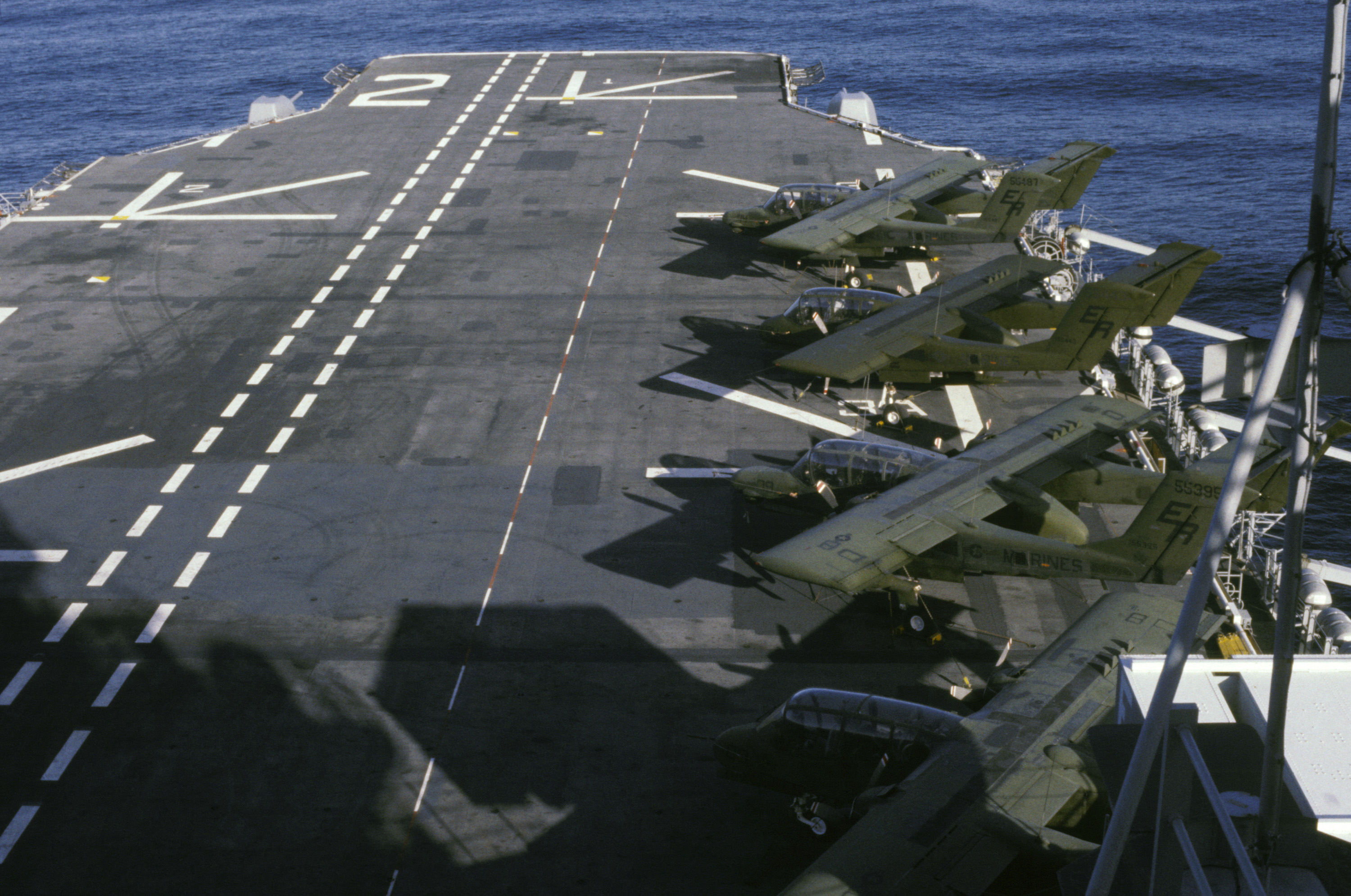
OV-10 Broncos of VMO-1 parked aboard Saipan in 1987

Starting at the end of October 1987, Saipan was in the Philadelphia Naval Shipyard for major refitting. In January 1989, Saipan returned to Norfolk, Virginia.

=== 1990s ===
From March 1990 through September 1990, Saipan was deployed for the fifth time to the Mediterranean. However, in late May 1990 it was diverted into the Eastern Atlantic, to what would become known as Mamba Station. While there, Saipan conducted a non-combatant evacuation operation (NEO), evacuating 1,600 civilians from war-torn Liberia in support of Operation Sharp Edge.

From September 1991 to March 1992, Saipan deployed to the Persian Gulf in support of Operation Desert Storm.

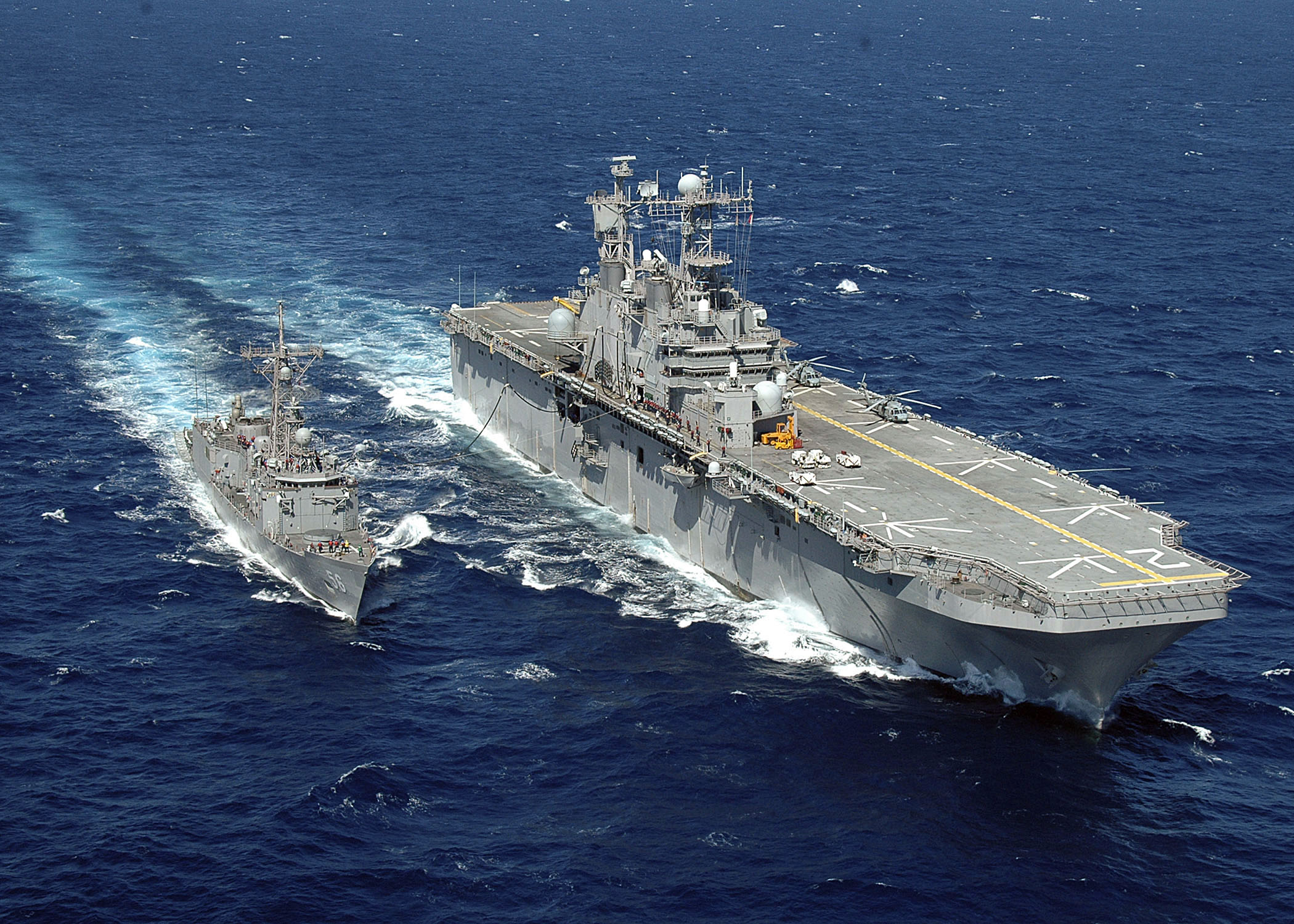
Saipan conducts an underway replenishment with USS Simpson during exercise Phoenix Express 2006.

Saipan again deployed to the Mediterranean in March 1993, in support of Operation Deny Flight and Operation Provide Promise. The ship returned in September 1993 and began her third scheduled complex overhaul in April 1994.

In June 1996, Saipan deployed to the Mediterranean and participated in Operation Decisive Endeavor and various multi-national training exercises. She returned to Norfolk in December 1996.

Saipan departed on her seventh deployment to the Mediterranean in July 1998. Saipan spent substantial operating time in the Adriatic Sea due to turmoil in Albania. On 28 July 1998 Saipan went to the rescue of the motor yacht MY Huntress which was burning approximately 98 miles (158 km) southwest of Corfu and 57 miles (92 km) east of Nisos Island (sic). The crew and guests were saved, but Huntress burned and sank despite damage control efforts of Saipan.

During her 1998 deployment to the Mediterranean Saipan with an Amphibious Ready Group (ARG) and 22nd Marine Expeditionary Unit (22nd MEU) (SOC) were split up to support several missions including Operation Balkan Calm in support of the Kosovo Diplomatic Observer Mission (KDOM) from 15 July 1998 to 19 November 1998, Operation Autumn Shelter, the Non-combatant evacuation operation (NEO) of the U.S. embassy in Kinshasa, Democratic Republic of the Congo from 10 August 1998 to 16 August 1998 and Operation Resolve Resolute in support of the Albania Security Mission at the U.S. embassy in Tirana, Albania from 17 August 1998 to 15 November 1998.

In 1999, Saipan became the developmental and operational test platform for the V-22 Osprey aircraft.

=== 2000s ===
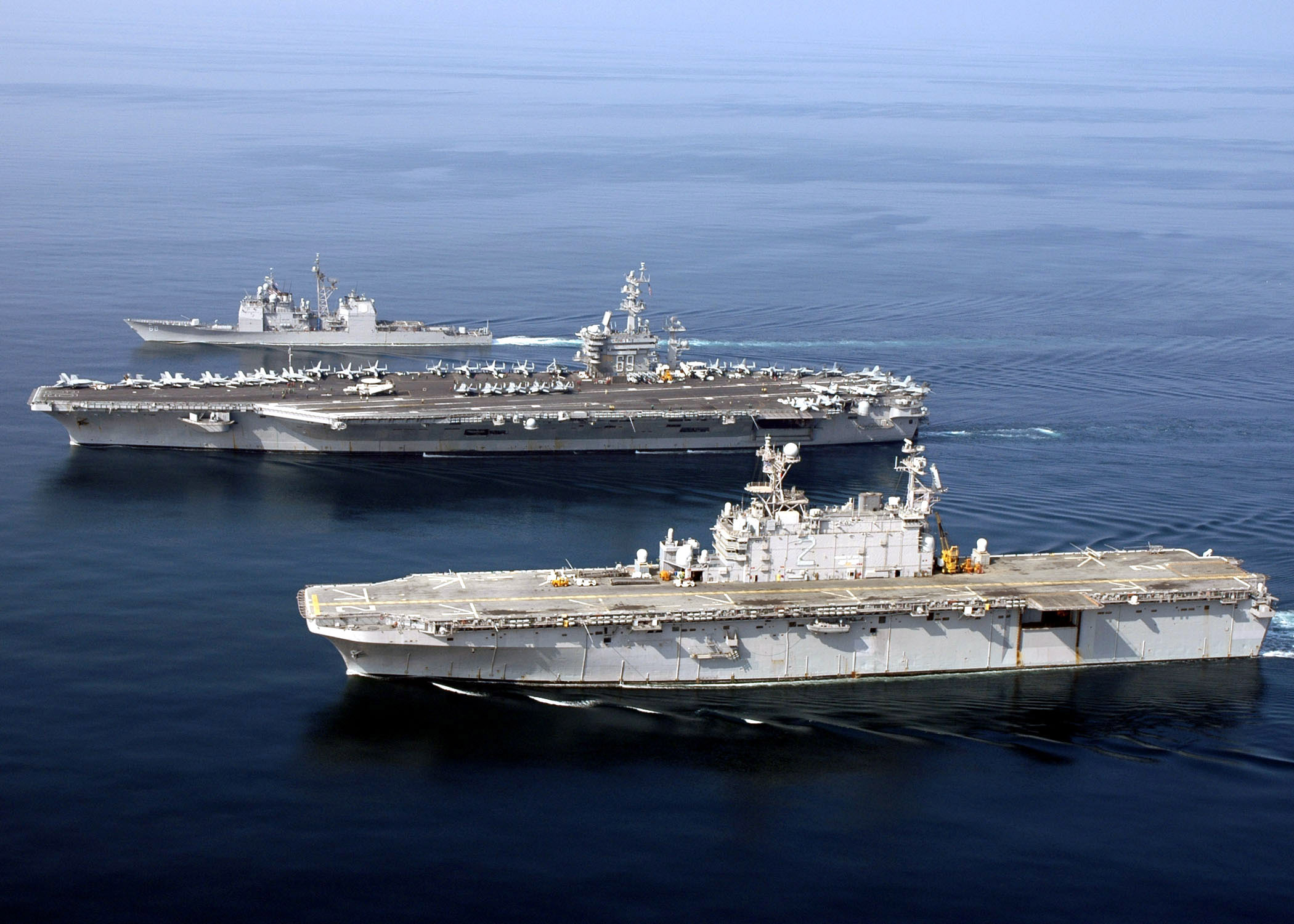
The guided-missile cruiser Anzio, Nimitz-class aircraft carrier Dwight D. Eisenhower, and amphibious assault ship Saipan sail in formation during a photographic exercise.

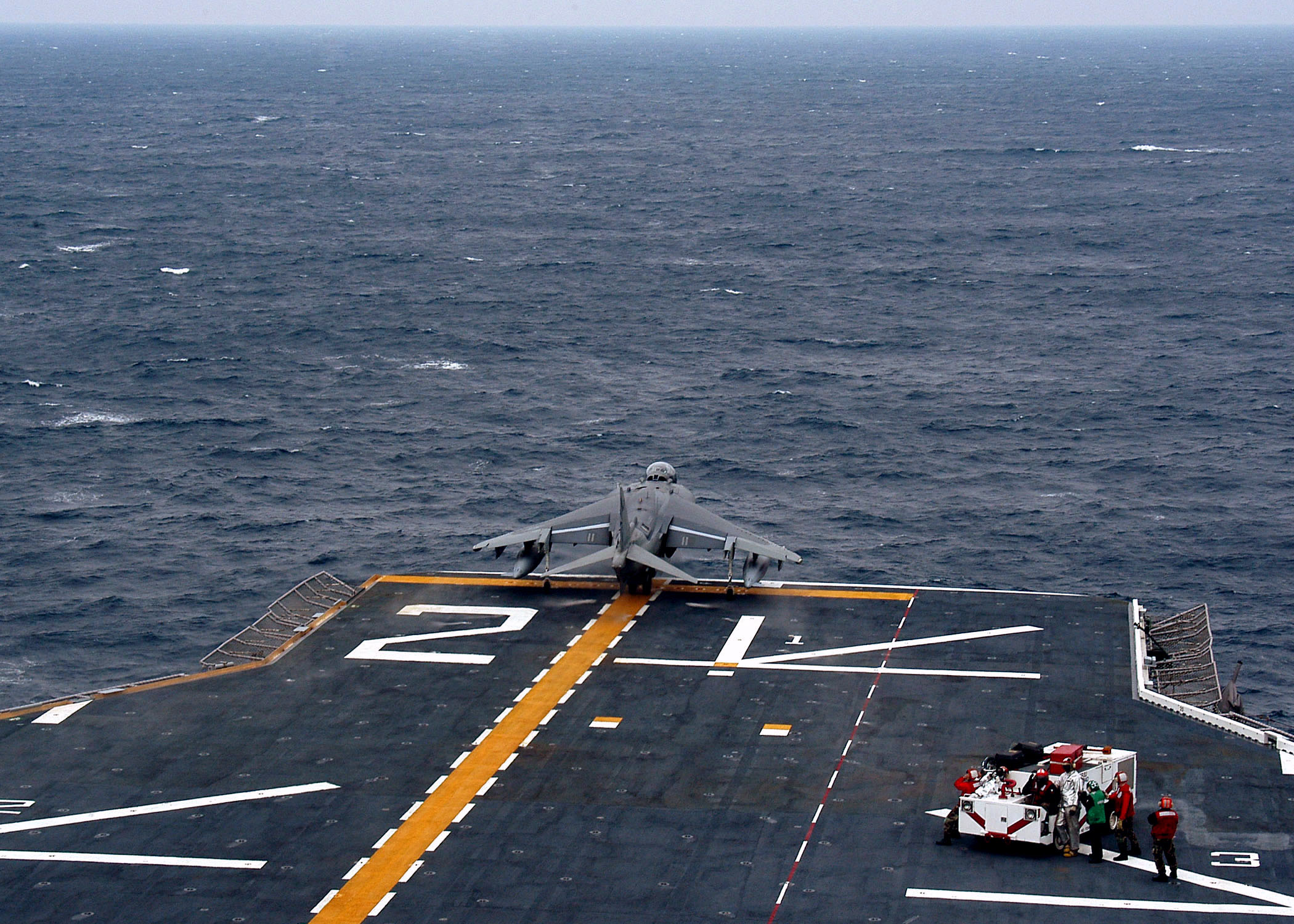
An AV-8B Harrier of VMA-223 launches from Saipan in 2004

In July 2000, Saipan began her eighth Mediterranean deployment. The ship commenced Adriatic presence operations during the Fall of 2000 federal elections in the Federal Republic of Yugoslavia.

On 12 February 2001, Saipan entered Norfolk Naval Shipyard for its fourth scheduled complex overhaul.

On 10 January 2003, Saipan was deployed to the Persian Gulf in support of Operation Iraqi Freedom and the war on terrorism.

From late January 2005 until early March 2005, Saipan was on a scheduled deployment to the U.S. Southern Command (USNAVSO) area of responsibility in support of New Horizons, the humanitarian civic assistance efforts in Haiti. In early June, she made an official visit to Oslo on the occasion of Norway's independence centennial. During the week of 26 June 2005, Saipan was one of two American military vessels (the other being USCGC Eagle) to participate in the Royal Navy International Fleet Review in the waters off Portsmouth, England. This review, conducted by Queen Elizabeth II and other members of the Royal Family, consisted of a parade of more than 166 ships from around the world. This event also coincided with the 2005 International Festival of the Sea and Trafalgar 200 celebration.

In May 2006, Saipan sailed for the Mediterranean to take part in multi-national training exercises during Operation Phoenix Express which involved the countries of Spain, Morocco, and Algeria. She returned to Norfolk in July. From 16 August, Saipan deployed to the Persian Gulf region in support of Operation Iraqi Freedom for her final operational deployment. She returned to Norfolk on 22 December.

=== Decommissioning ===
Saipan was decommissioned on 20 April 2007 at her home port in Naval Station Norfolk. She was used for weapons effect testing, providing vital information on structural integrity and survivability which will assist in the designing and planning of future ships. She was transferred to the inactive fleet, and was tied up at Pier 4 of the Naval Inactive Ship Maintenance Facility in Philadelphia, where she was joined by ex-John F. Kennedy on 22 March 2008.

On 30 September 2009, a contract to dismantle ex-Saipan was issued to International Shipbreaking Ltd, Brownsville, Texas and on 28 October 2009 the ship departed Philadelphia under tow.

International Shipbreaking completed scrapping ex-Saipan on 23 February 2011.

== USS Saipan awards ==
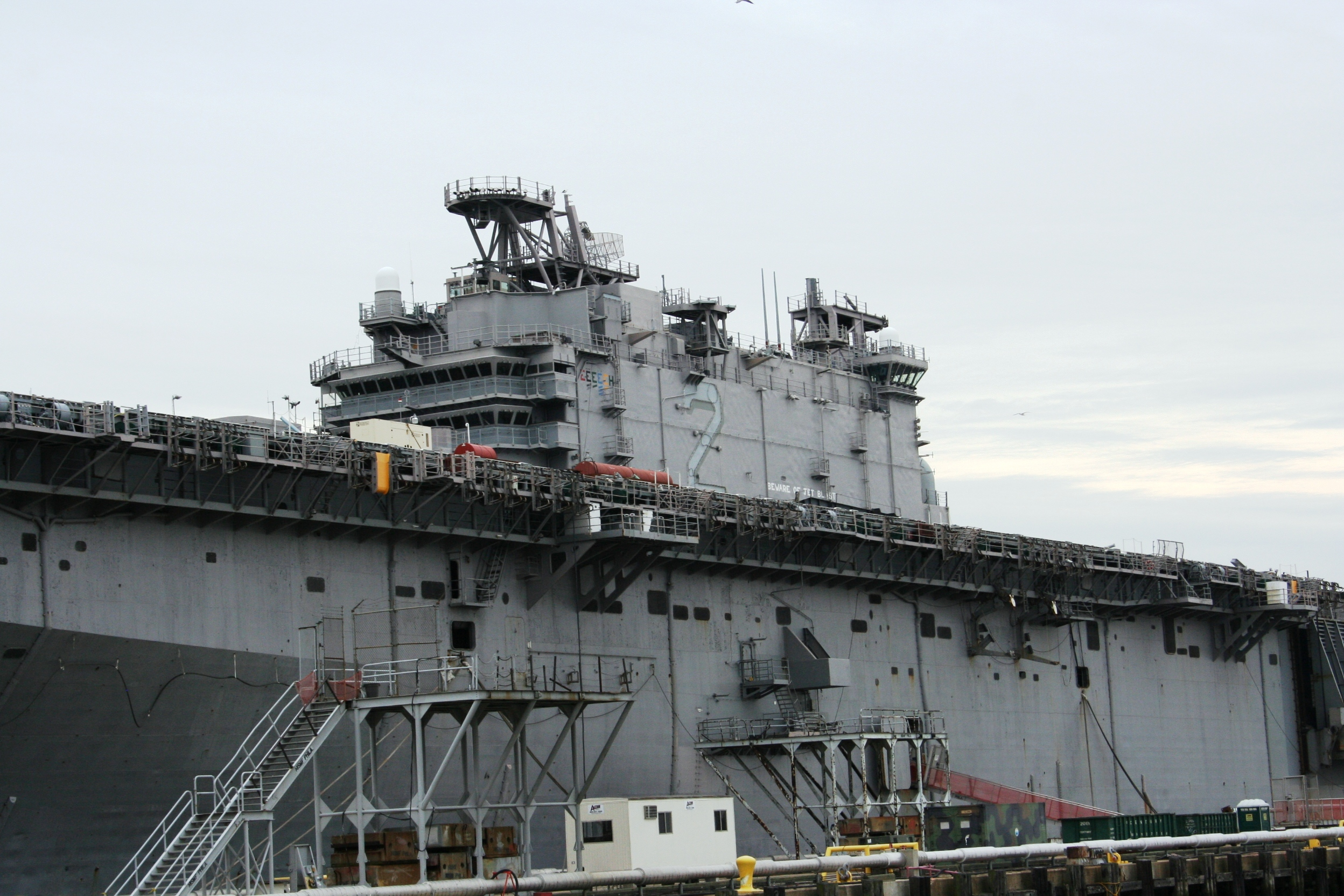
Saipan at Philadelphia Naval Inactive Ship Maintenance Facility in January 2008.

Saipan's awards include the Armed Forces Expeditionary Medal, Navy Expeditionary Medal (two awards), Humanitarian Service Medal, Battle Efficiency "E" (four awards), the Admiral Flatley Safety Award (two awards), the Sledge Award, the Atlantic Fleet Surface Force "Admiral's Cup" in 1985, COMPHIBRON Twelve's "Bronze Anchor" for retention excellence, and the 1993 COMNAVSURFLANT Command Excellence Award for Command and Control, Maritime Warfare and Logistics Management.
