= Portland Museum =

Portland Museum may refer to:

- Portland Museum (Louisville), Louisville, Kentucky, USA
- Portland Museum, Dorset, England (on the Isle of Portland)
- Portland Museum of Art, Maine, USA
- Portland Art Museum, Oregon, USA
- Portland Children's Museum, Oregon, USA
- Portland Gallery, London, England
- 'The Portland Museum', collection of Margaret Cavendish-Harley, Duchess of Portland, now dissolved
