= Portlandia (disambiguation) =

Portlandia is an American sketch comedy TV series.

Portlandia may also refer to:

- Portlandia (statue), by Raymond Kaskey
- 757 Portlandia, an asteroid
- Portlandia (bivalve), marine bivalve molluscs
- Portlandia (plant), flowering plants in the coffee family

== See also ==
- Portland, Oregon
