= Portland, Illinois =

Portland, Illinois may refer to:

- Blue Island, Illinois in Cook County
- Oglesby, Illinois in LaSalle County
- Portland Township, Whiteside County, Illinois
