= USS Portland (LPD-27) =

US Navy amphibious transport ship

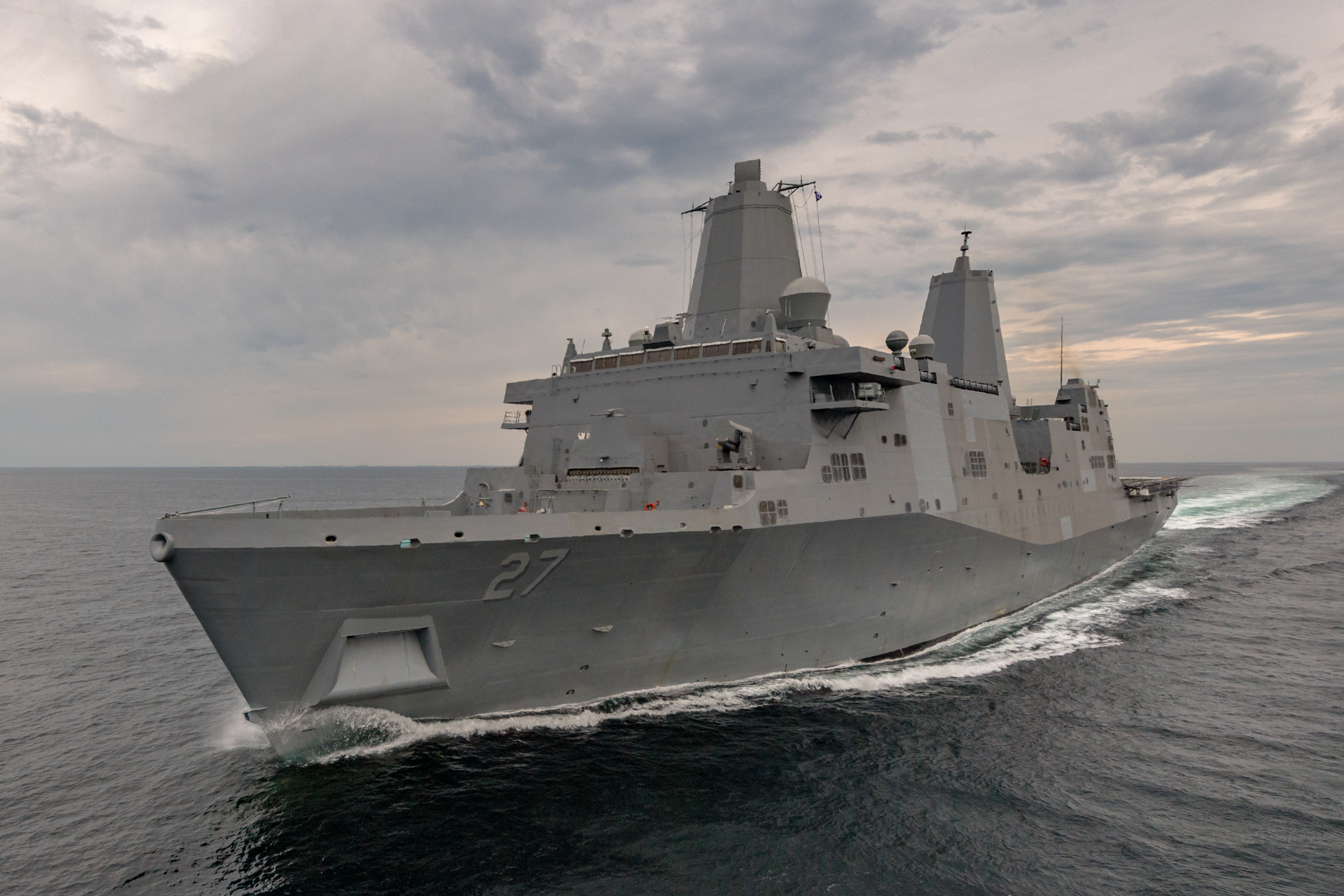
- USS Portland during her sea trials in June 2017

History

United States
- Name: Portland
- Namesake: Portland, Oregon
- Awarded: 27 July 2012
- Builder: Ingalls Shipbuilding
- Laid down: 2 August 2013
- Launched: 13 February 2016
- Acquired: 18 September 2017
- Commissioned: 14 December 2017
- Home port: San Diego
- Identification: MMSI number: 368926288; Pennant number: LPD-27
- Motto: First Responders Brave and Determined
- Status: in active service
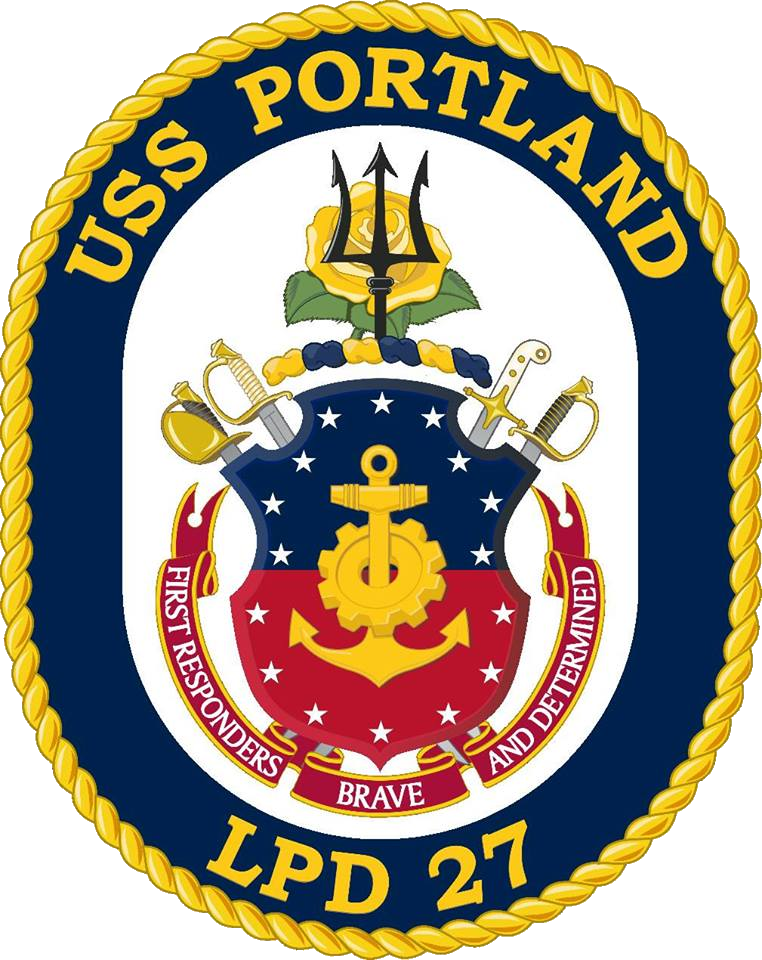
- Badge

General characteristics
- Class & type: San Antonio-class amphibious transport dock
- Displacement: 25,000 long tons (25,000 t) full
- Length: 208.5 m (684 ft 1 in) overall; 201.4 m (660 ft 9 in) waterline
- Beam: 31.9 m (104 ft 8 in) extreme, 29.5 m (96 ft 9 in) waterline
- Draft: 7 m (23 ft 0 in)
- Installed power: 40,000 hp (30,000 kW)
- Propulsion: Four Colt-Pielstick diesel engines, two shafts
- Speed: 22 knots (41 km/h)
- Boats & landing craft carried: 2 LCACs (air cushion); or 1 LCU (conventional)
- Capacity: 699 (66 officers, 633 enlisted); surge to 800 total.
- Complement: 28 officers, 333 enlisted
- Armament: 2 × 30 mm Bushmaster II cannons, for surface threat defense; 2 × Rolling Airframe Missile launchers for air defense Laser Weapon System (temporary testing)
- Aircraft carried: 4 CH-46 Sea Knight helicopters or 2 MV-22 tilt rotor aircraft may be launched or recovered simultaneously.

USS Portland (LPD-27) is a San Antonio-class amphibious transport dock ship of the United States Navy, named after the U.S. city of Portland, Oregon. The ship was laid down in 2013, launched in 2016 and commissioned in 2018. The ship was armed with a Laser Weapon System for testing.

== Construction and career ==
Portland's keel was laid down on 2 August 2013, at the Ingalls Shipbuilding yard in Pascagoula, Mississippi. The ship's sponsor is Bonnie Amos, wife of U.S. Marine Corps Commandant General James F. Amos. Portland was launched on 13 February 2016. She was delivered to the Navy on 18 September 2017.

She was commissioned on 14 December 2017. Her commissioning ceremony was held on 21 April 2018, when she was in the city of Portland for the festivities. The commissioning ceremony was protested by a number of local anti-war groups, who opposed a warship being named after the city.

=== Laser weapon system ===
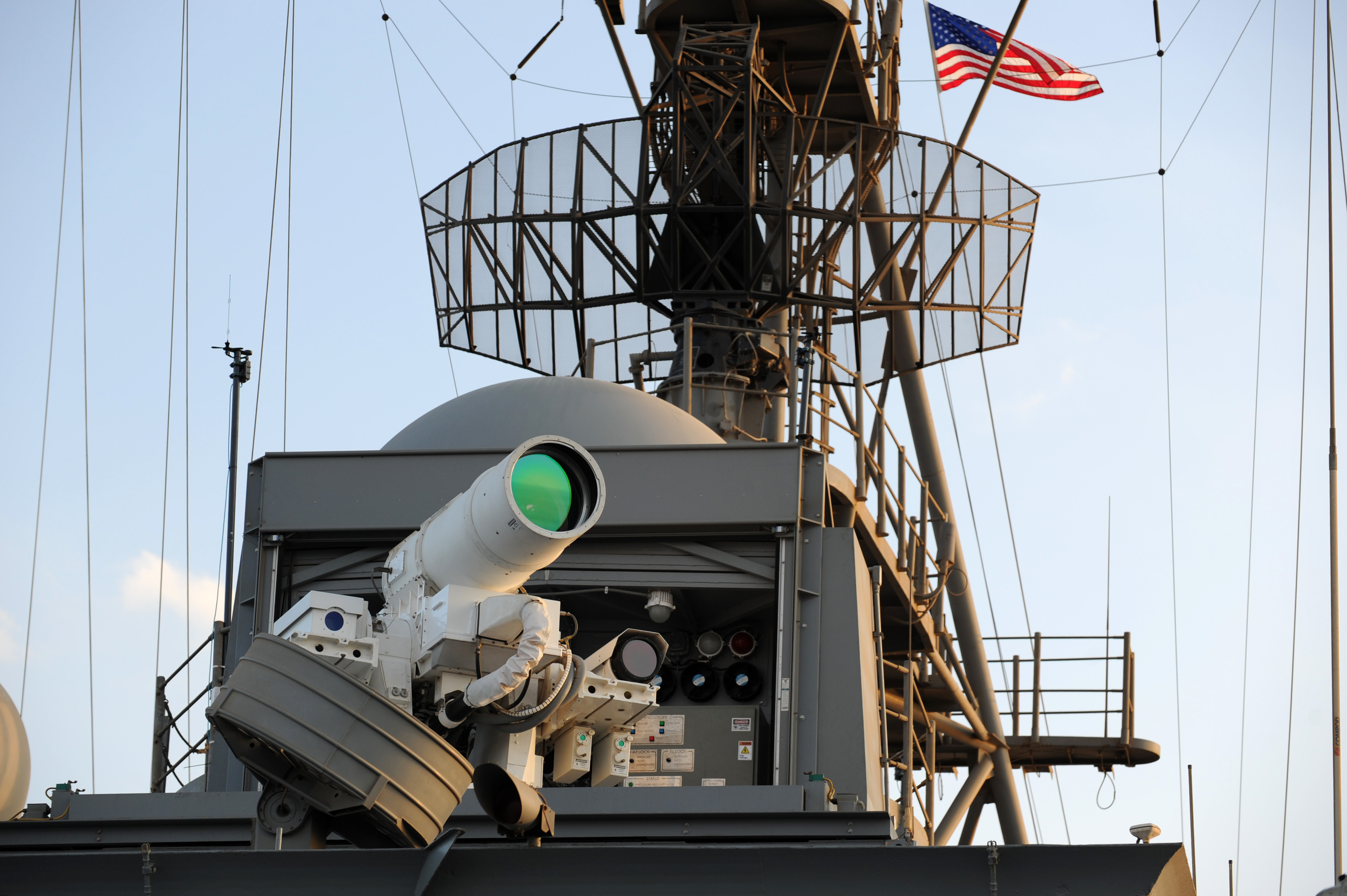
Laser Weapon System (LaWS)

A next-generation follow-on to the AN/SEQ-3 Laser Weapon System (LaWS) was slated for integration onto Portland as a technology demonstration after the decommissioning of USS Ponce, which carried the LaWS before it, and was installed at the end of 2018. In May 2020, Portland successfully destroyed an unmanned aerial vehicle (UAV) with the solid-state laser, Technology Maturation Laser Weapon System Demonstrator (LWSD) MK 2 MOD 0 with a power level of 150 kW. In December 2021, the LaWS successfully destroyed a marine target floating in the Gulf of Aden.

=== 2022 ===
On 27–30 May, Portland and USS Essex were open to the public as a part of Los Angeles Fleet Week 2022, in San Pedro, California.

=== Spacecraft recoveries ===
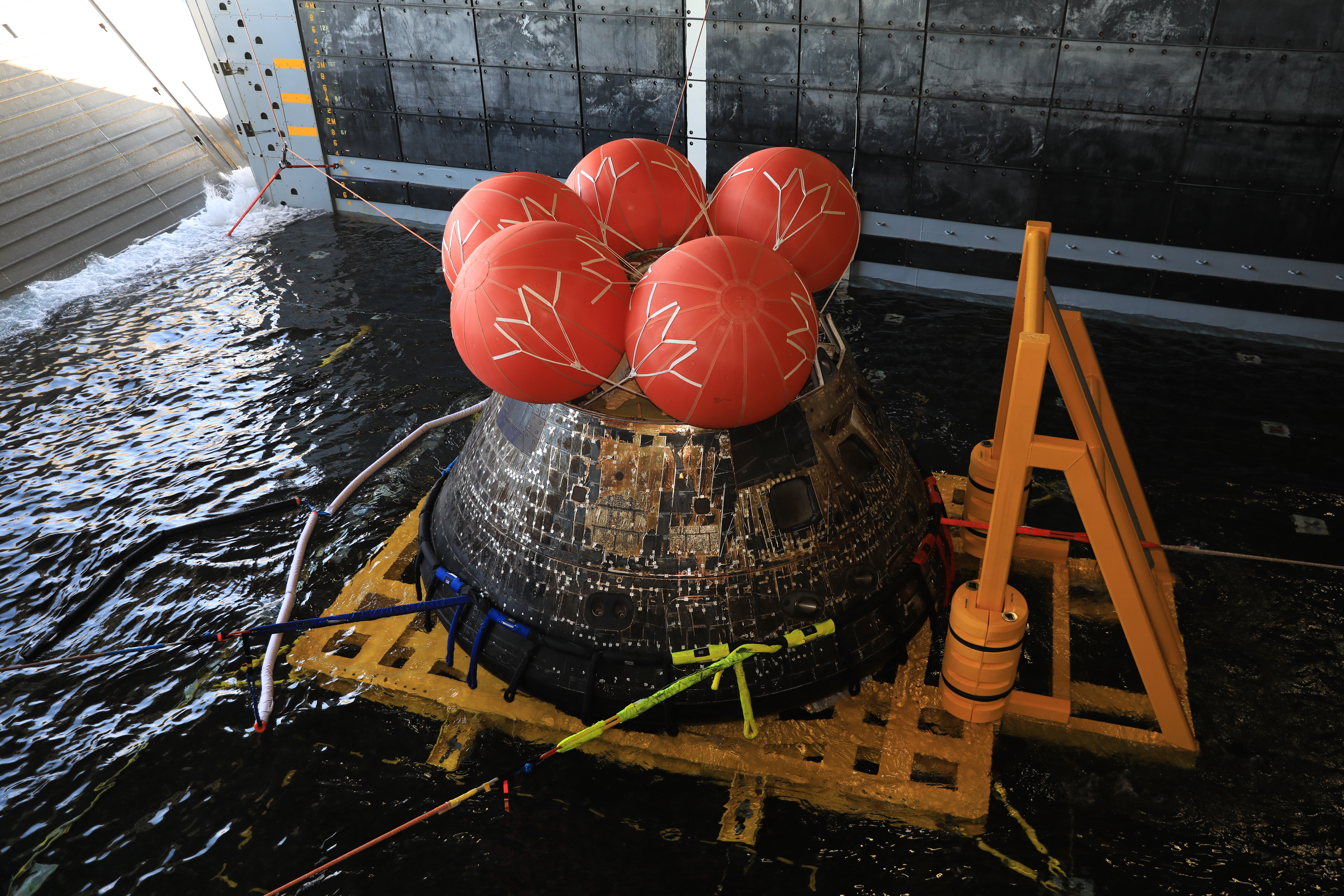
The Orion capsule from Artemis 1 aboard USS Portland on 11 December 2022

Portland was assigned as the recovery ship for the Orion capsule of the Artemis 1 uncrewed Moon-orbiting mission, successfully completed on 11 December 2022. The spacecraft's floating Orion capsule was pulled into the flooded well deck at the stern of the vessel off the coast of Baja California.

=== 2026 Iran war ===
On 19 March 2026, it was reported that USS Boxer-led Amphibious Ready Group (ARG) was deploying ahead of schedule to support Operation Epic Fury. It would be joined by Portland and USS Comstock. The ARG would join the Tripoli Amphibious Ready Group that is already underway. The 11th Marine Expeditionary Unit (MEU) has embarked on the ARG ships which will sail through the Indo-Pacific to the Middle East. There are around 2,500 Marine Corps personnel of the total of 4,000 service members in the fleet. The sailors and Marines have shortened their leave following certification and training in order to accelerate their deployment.
