= City of Portland IV =

Portland, Maine, has operated a series of fireboats named the City of Portland. The fourth vessel named City of Portland was commissioned in 2010.

The 65 feet (20 m) vessel cost $3.2 million to construct. Included in it design is an infirmary laid out exactly the same as local ambulances, so that medical technicians would not require any training to familiarize themselves with its layout.

The vessel has stirred controversy due to several groundings. Edward D. Murphy, of the Portland Press Herald, had to resort to the Freedom of Information Act request to acquire a copy of a report on a grounding in October 2011. Murphy reports a mystery remains as to why there were a dozen unnamed passengers on the vessel, when she grounded.
