= HMS Portland (1744) =

Ship of the line of the Royal Navy

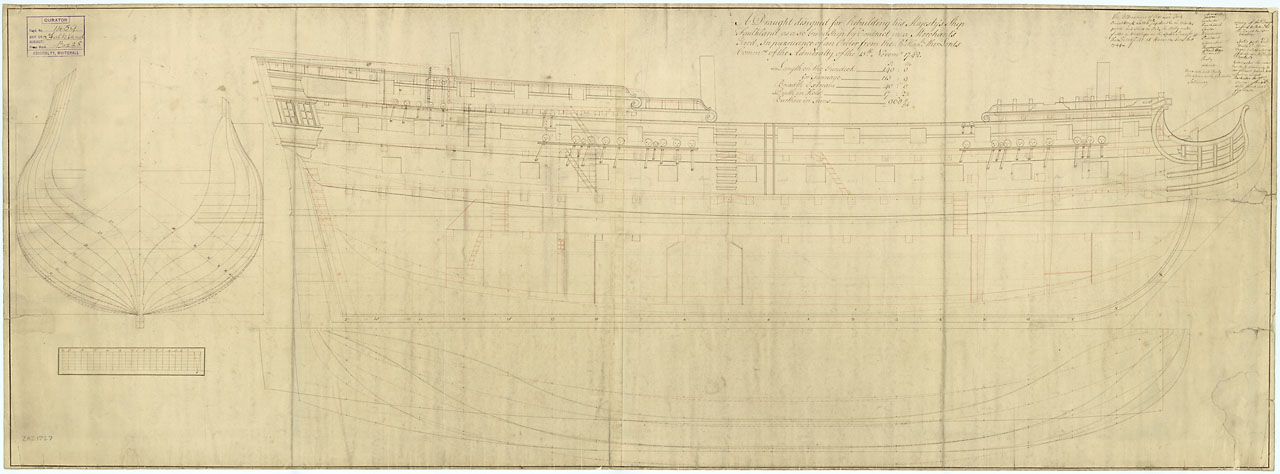
- Portland

History

Great Britain
- Name: HMS Portland
- Ordered: 24 April 1743
- Builder: Snellgrove, Limehouse
- Launched: 11 October 1744
- Honours and awards: Second Battle of Cape Finisterre, 1747
- Fate: Sold, 1763

General characteristics
- Class & type: 1741 proposals 50-gun fourth rate ship of the line
- Tons burthen: 974
- Length: 140 ft (42.7 m) (gundeck)
- Beam: 40 ft (12.2 m)
- Depth of hold: 17 ft 2 1/2 in (5.2 m)
- Propulsion: Sails
- Sail plan: Full-rigged ship
- Armament: 50 guns: Gundeck: 22 × 24 pdrs; Upper gundeck: 22 × 12 pdrs; Quarterdeck: 4 × 6 pdrs; Forecastle: 2 × 6 pdrs

HMS Portland was a 50-gun fourth rate ship of the line of the Royal Navy, built at Limehouse according to the dimensions laid down in the 1741 proposals of the 1719 Establishment, and launched on 11 October 1744.

Portland served until 1763, when she was sold out of the navy.
