= List of amphibious warfare vessels of World War II =

This is a list of amphibious warfare ships of the Second World War.

The List of ships of the Second World War contains major military vessels of the war, arranged alphabetically and by type. The list includes armed vessels that served during the war and in the immediate aftermath, inclusive of localized ongoing combat operations, garrison surrenders, post-surrender occupation, colony re-occupation, troop and prisoner repatriation, to the end of 1945.

For smaller vessels, see also list of World War II ships of less than 1000 tons. Some uncompleted Axis ships are included, out of historic interest. Ships are designated to the country under which they operated for the longest period of the Second World War, regardless of where they were built or previous service history.

List of destroyers of World War II
Ship	Operator	Class	Type	Displacement (tons)	First commissioned	Fate
Akitsu Maru	Imperial Japanese Army	Type C	landing craft carrier escort carrier	11,800	30 January 1942	sunk 15 November 1944
Ashland	United States Navy	Ashland	Dock landing ship	7,930	5 June 1943	Stricken 25 November 1969
Belle Grove	United States Navy	Ashland	Dock landing ship	7,930	9 August 1943	Stricken 12 November 1969
Cabildo	United States Navy	Casa Grande	Dock landing ship	7,930	15 March 1945	Sunk as a target September 1985
Carter Hall	United States Navy	Ashland	Dock landing ship	7,930	18 September 1943	Stricken 1 November 1968
Casa Grande	United States Navy	Casa Grande	Dock landing ship	7,930	5 June 1944	scrapped 6 April 1992
Catamount	United States Navy	Casa Grande	Dock landing ship	7,930	9 April 1945	Scrapped 4 December 1975
Colonial	United States Navy	Casa Grande	Dock landing ship	7,930	15 May 1945	Scrapped 8 September 1993
Comstock	United States Navy	Casa Grande	Dock landing ship	7,930	2 July 1945	Transferred to Taiwan 17 October 1984
Donner	United States Navy	Casa Grande	Dock landing ship	7,930	31 July 1945	Scrapped March 2005
Eastway	Royal Navy	Casa Grande	Dock landing ship	7,930	14 November 1943	Transferred to Greece, 1953
Epping Forest	United States Navy	Ashland	Dock landing ship	7,930	10 November 1943	Transferred to Argentina, 1970
Fort Mandan	United States Navy	Casa Grande	Dock landing ship	7,930	31 October 1945	Transferred to Greece 23 January 1971
Fort Marion	United States Navy	Casa Grande	Dock landing ship	7,930	29 January 1946	Transferred to Taiwan, 15 April 1977
Gunston Hall	United States Navy	Ashland	Dock landing ship	7,930	9 December 1943	Stricken 1 December 1967
Highway	Royal Navy	Casa Grande	Dock landing ship	7,930	19 October 1943	scrapped 17 December 1948
Hyūga Maru	Imperial Japanese Army	M Type A	landing craft carrier		November 1944	sunk
Kibitsu Maru	Imperial Japanese Army	M Type A	landing craft carrier		December 1943	sunk
Kumano Maru	Imperial Japanese Army	M Type C	landing craft carrier escort carrier	8,128	31 March 1945	scrapped 4 November 1947
Lindenwald	United States Navy	Ashland	Dock landing ship	7,930	5 January 1944	Stricken 31 October 1969
Mayasan Maru	Imperial Japanese Army	Type A	landing craft carrier	11,910	December 1942	sunk 17 November 1944
Nigitsu Maru	Imperial Japanese Army	Type A	landing craft carrier	11,800	March 1943	sunk 12 January 1944
Northway	United States Navy	Casa Grande	Dock landing ship	7,930	15 February 1944	sold 19 March 1948
Oak Hill	United States Navy	Ashland	Dock landing ship	7,930	29 January 1944	Transferred to Taiwan, November 1960
Oceanway	Royal Navy	Casa Grande	Dock landing ship	7,930	29 March 1944	Transferred to Greece March 1947
Rushmore	United States Navy	Casa Grande	Dock landing ship	7,930	3 July 1944	Sunk as a target 16 April 1993
San Marcos	United States Navy	Casa Grande	Dock landing ship	7,930	15 April 1945	Transferred to Spain, 1 July 1971
Settsu Maru	Imperial Japanese Army	M Type A	landing craft carrier		January 1945	Scrapped post war
Shadwell	United States Navy	Casa Grande	Dock landing ship	7,930	24 July 1944	Scrapped 2017
Shinshū Maru	Imperial Japanese Army	Shinshū Maru	landing craft carrier	7,100	15 November 1934	sunk 3 January 1945
Takatsu Maru	Imperial Japanese Army	Type B	landing craft carrier	5,656	January 1944	sunk 10 November 1944
Tamatsu Maru	Imperial Japanese Army	Type A	landing craft carrier	11,910	20 January 1944	sunk 19 August 1944
Tortuga	United States Navy	Casa Grande	Dock landing ship	7,930	8 June 1945	scrapped 1988
Whetstone	United States Navy	Casa Grande	Dock landing ship	7,930	12 February 1946	scrapped 17 February 1983
White Marsh	United States Navy	Ashland	Dock landing ship	7,930	29 January 1944	Transferred to Taiwan November 1960

== See also ==
- List of amphibious warfare ships
- Dock landing ship
- Landing craft carrier
