= USS Cabildo =

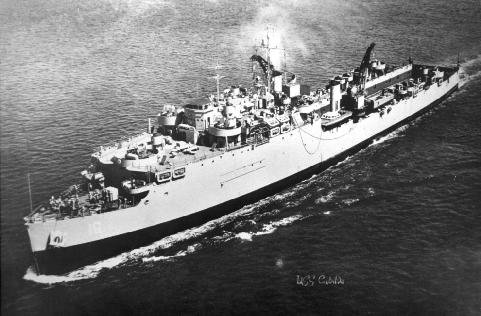
- Cabildo, early 1950s, before addition of flight deck

History

United States
- Name: USS Cabildo
- Namesake: The Cabildo in New Orleans, Louisiana
- Awarded: 1 July 1943
- Builder: Newport News Shipbuilding and Drydock Co., Newport News, Virginia
- Laid down: 24 July 1944
- Launched: 22 December 1944
- Commissioned: 15 March 1945
- Decommissioned: 31 March 1970
- Stricken: 15 October 1976
- Honors and awards: 2 battle stars (Korea); 6 battle stars (Vietnam)
- Fate: Sunk as a target, September 1985

General characteristics
- Class & type: Casa Grande-class dock landing ship
- Displacement: 4,032 long tons (4,097 t) light; 7,930 long tons (8,057 t) full load
- Length: 457 ft 9 in (139.52 m)
- Beam: 72 ft (22 m)
- Draft: 18 ft (5.5 m)
- Propulsion: 2 steam turbines, 2 shafts
- Speed: 15 knots (28 km/h; 17 mph)
- Boats & landing craft carried: 3 LCTs in 392 ft (119 m) × 44 ft (13 m) Well deck
- Troops: Accommodation for 240 combat troops
- Complement: 326
- Armament: 1 × 5"/38 caliber gun; 4 × 40 mm guns (2×2); 16 × 20 mm guns (16×1)
- Aviation facilities: 1 helicopter landing pad

USS Cabildo (LSD-16) was a Casa Grande-class dock landing ship of the United States Navy. She was named for The Cabildo in New Orleans, the old town hall and now a historical museum, where the formal transfer of the Louisiana Territory from France to the United States took place.

Cabildo was laid down on 24 July 1944 by Newport News Shipbuilding and Drydock Co., Newport News, Virginia; launched on 22 December 1944, sponsored by Miss A. B. Pendleton; and commissioned on 15 March 1945.

== Service history ==
=== World War II, 1945–1947 ===
Cabildo sailed from New York City on 6 May 1945 for Pearl Harbor, where she arrived on 8 June. She carried out her duties of docking and repairing small craft, transporting amphibious craft, and operating boat-pools at Guam and Okinawa in July. After carrying boats to the Philippines in August, Cabildo reported in Wakanoura Wan, Honshū, on 11 September. Here she loaded Javanese, Dutch, and Australians, rescued from Japanese prison camps, who she carried to Okinawa. Laden with men of the Army Engineers, she arrived at Manila on 3 October, then sailed for Japan, where she acted as receiving and repair ship at Sasebo and Yokosuka until 19 April 1946. Cabildo returned to the west coast on 12 May 1946, and was decommissioned on 15 January 1947.

=== Korea, 1950–1952 ===
Recommissioned at San Diego on 5 October 1950, she took part in atomic weapons tests in the Marshalls — "Operation Greenhouse" — in which she was one of the first ships to become radioactive. After extensive decontamination she sailed, on 21 November 1951, from San Diego for duty in Korean waters. She lifted soldiers and marines from Japan to Korea, and from Korea's east coast to the Inchon battle lines, and during a part of her tour served as flagship and tender to Mine Squadron 3 in its dangerous operations. While with this group in April off Wonsan, Cabildo received a direct hit from a shore battery, suffered a few casualties, but was able to continue her mission. The battleship Iowa later arrived to cover her.

=== 1952–1960 ===
Returning to San Diego on 2 September 1952, Cabildo prepared for another extended Far Eastern deployment from 3 July 1953 to 23 April 1954. In 1955 she was fitted with mezzanine and helicopter decks, and from that time operated extensively with Marine units in developing the vertical envelopment concept of amphibious warfare. Cabildo's west coast operations alternated with two tours of duty in the Far East from January 1956 to July 1958. Clearing San Diego on 11 February 1959, she carried craft and an underwater demolition team detachment to the Aleutians before continuing to Japan. After duty in Japanese and Formosan waters, she returned to Long Beach on 5 June 1959. Amphibious exercises at Okinawa highlighted her 1960 deployment, which began on 16 February and continued through the major portion of the year.

=== 1963-1965 ===
In the spring of 1963, the ship sailed back to the West Coast and her home port of Long Beach via the Panama Canal after serving as part of the Navy's Cuban Missile Blockade. In the fall of 1963, she was deployed to Asia and visited Pearl Harbor, Subic Bay and Japan. During this period she made six trips to Okinawa and also sailed to Guam and the Kwajalein Atoll. During her Asian tour of duty she was in a collision at sea when most of the Electronic Parts Storeroom was lost as it spilled into the ocean.

In April 1964 she headed back to her home port of Long Beach. Several months later she went into dry dock for upgrades and spent 6 months in Portland Oregon.

During this time period, the ship had visited every major city and port on the West Coast of America's mainland.

In 1965, she and the USS Galveston were available for naval gunfire support and 3rd Battalion, 12th Marines in Van Tuong which was the artillery unit in direct support. USS Vernon County embarked elements of the 3rd Battalion, 3rd Marines (Battalion Landing Team) (BLT) 3, under Lieutenant Colonel Joseph E. Muir, USMC, at Chu Lai, and sailed south along the coast to An Thuong, where she put the troops ashore in phase one of Operation Starlite.

=== Decommissioning and disposal ===
Cabildo was decommissioned on 31 March 1970 at Long Beach, CA, and laid up in the Pacific Reserve Fleet. She was struck from the Naval Register on 15 October 1976, and used as a fleet target, sunk by grounding at San Nicholas Island in September 1985.

Cabildo received two battle stars for service in the Korean War and six battle stars for the Vietnam War.
