= USS Colonial =

American dock landing ship

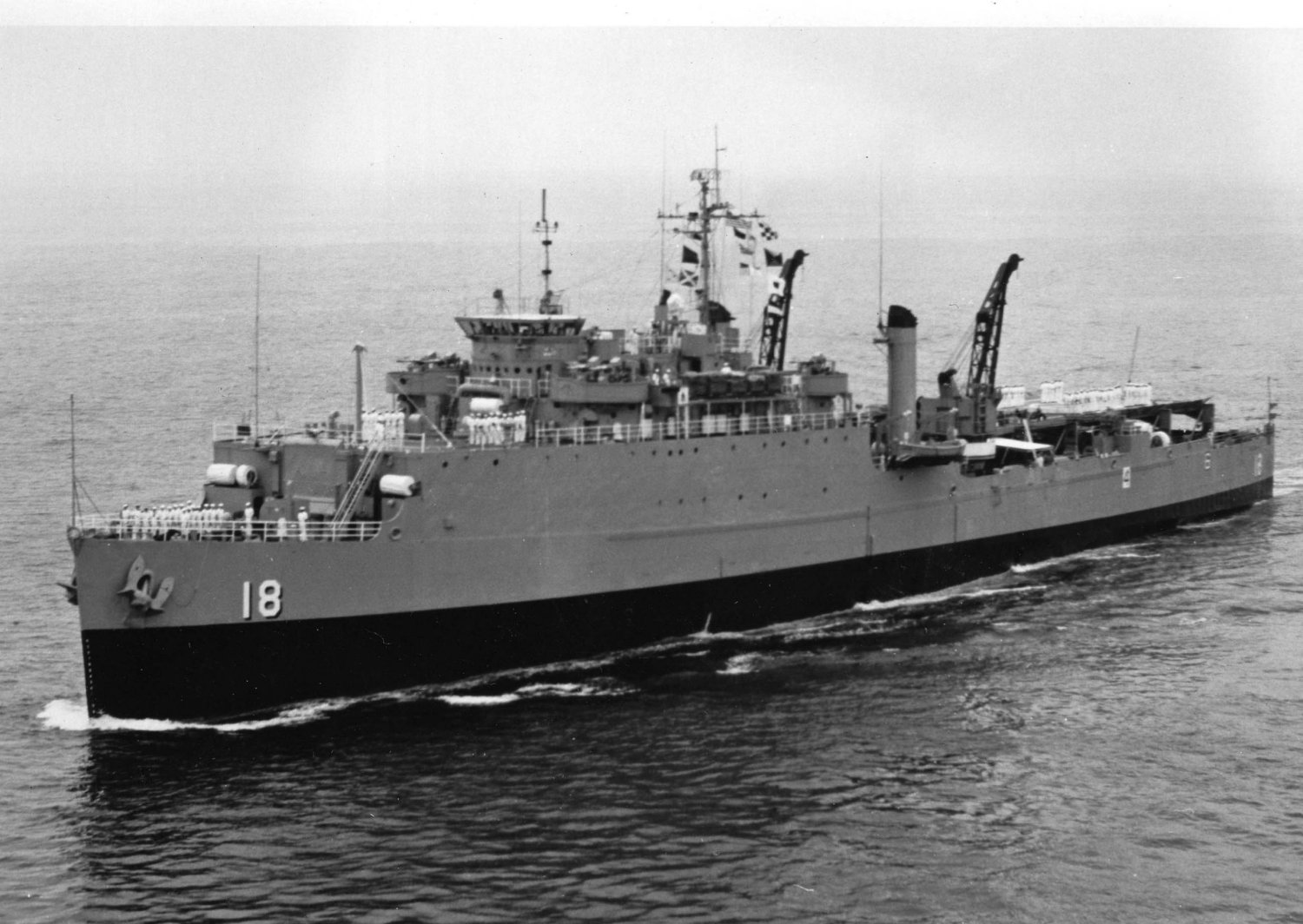
- USS Colonial (LSD-18) underway, circa 1970

History

United States
- Name: USS Colonial
- Namesake: Colonial National Historical Park in Virginia
- Awarded: 1 July 1943
- Laid down: 1 August 1944
- Launched: 28 February 1945
- Commissioned: 15 May 1945
- Decommissioned: 1970
- Stricken: 15 October 1976
- Fate: Sold for scrap, 8 September 1993

General characteristics
- Displacement: 7,930 tons (loaded), 4,032 tons (light draft)
- Length: 457 ft 9 in (139.5 m) overall
- Beam: 72 ft 2 in (22.0 m)
- Draft: 8 ft 2½ in (2.5 m) fwd, 10 ft ½ in (3.1 m) aft (light); 15 ft 5½ in (4.7 m) fwd, 16 ft 2 in (4.9 m) aft (loaded)
- Propulsion: 2 Babcock & Wilcox boilers, 2 Skinner Uniflow Reciprocating Steam Engines, 2 propeller shafts – each shaft 3,700 hp, at 240 rpm total shaft horse power 7,400, 2 11 ft 9 in diameter, 9 ft 9 in pitch propellers
- Speed: 17 knots (31 km/h)
- Range: 8,000 nmi. at 15 knots; (15,000 km at 28 km/h)
- Boats & landing craft carried: 3 × LCT (Mk V or VI); each w/ 5 medium tanks or; 2 × LCT (Mk III or IV); each w/ 12 medium tanks or; 14 × LCM (Mk III); each w/ 1 medium tank; or 1,500 long tons cargo or; 47 × DUKW or; 41 × LVT or; Any combination of landing vehicles and landing craft up to capacity
- Capacity: 22 officers, 218 men
- Complement: 17 officers, 237 men (ship); 6 officers, 30 men (landing craft)
- Armament: 1 × 5 in / 38 cal. DP gun; 2 × 40 mm quad AA guns; 2 × 40 mm twin AA guns; 16 × 20 mm AA guns
- Aircraft carried: modified to accommodate helicopters on an added portable deck

USS Colonial (LSD-18) was a Casa Grande-class dock landing ship of the United States Navy, named in honor of the Colonial National Historical Park, which comprises Jamestown, Williamsburg, and Yorktown in southeastern Virginia.

Colonial was launched on 28 February 1945 by Newport News Shipbuilding and Drydock Co., Newport News, Va., sponsored by Mrs. L. L. Dean; and commissioned on 15 May 1945.

== 1945–1952 ==
Colonial cleared Norfolk on 26 July 1945 for the Panama Canal, San Francisco and Pearl Harbor, arriving 5 September. Between 11 September and 26 December, she had duty ferrying landing craft among the Pacific Islands and to Okinawa. She sailed from Pearl Harbor 29 December for the Panama Canal and Norfolk, arriving 23 January 1946.

Colonial participated in amphibious training out of Norfolk, conducting local, east coast, and Caribbean operations, and voyaging from Cuba and Puerto Rico as far north as Newfoundland until 15 August 1950, when she cleared Norfolk for Far Eastern duty. Calling at San Diego en route to Kobe, Colonial landed men and tanks of the 1st Marine Division at Inchon in September, and troops and equipment at Wonsan and Iwon in December. Colonial was one of the last ships to leave Hungnam in the evacuation of that area. She acted as "mother ship" for minesweepers on the Korean east coast for a month during this tour, returning to San Diego, her new home port, 27 August 1951. Here she was overhauled and had underway training before returning to Japan and Korea for duty from 17 January to 4 November 1952. During this tour she supported minesweepers working in Wonsan Harbor, and took part in amphibious training.

== 1953–1970 ==
From the close of the Korean War into 1960, Colonial continued to alternate local operations and training out of San Diego with periodic deployments to the Far East. She transported Marines to Korea from 5 August to 9 September 1953, returning to the western Pacific in October for a tour which ended in July 1954. After aiding in the development of the vertical envelopment concept of amphibious assault employing helicopters, she returned to the Orient early in 1955 for a tour of duty which included participation in the evacuation of the Tachen Islands.

In the summer of 1956, Colonial served as a floating laboratory in experiments with balloon-launched rockets (rockoons). The Naval Research Laboratory's Operation San Diego High had the objective of studying x-rays and Lyman-alpha UV radiation produced in the upper atmosphere by solar flares. For ten days in July, from a location 350 miles southeast of San Diego, each morning a balloon carrying an instrumented Deacon rocket was launched from the helicopter deck of Colonial. The destroyer USS Perkins would pursue the balloon as it drifted downwind. Observatories watching the sun from New Mexico, Tokyo, San Francisco, and Mexico City would notify the scientists aboard Colonial as soon as a flare was observed. They in turn would signal Perkins to launch the rocket – through the balloon – up to the ionosphere. The operation had extensive coverage in the April 1957 issue of the National Geographic Magazine, with a journalist and a photographer on the ship.

Colonial returned to the Far East in 1957. On 30 May she went to the rescue of a grounded Chinese freighter. On her 1958–59 deployment, she provided repair parts and skilled hands for the American merchant tanker Wang Buccaneer, disabled at sea in January.

Colonial served in several campaigns in the Vietnam War between 1965 and 1968.

Colonial was decommissioned in 1970 at the Inactive Ship Maintenance Facility, Vallejo, California, and laid up in the Pacific Reserve Fleet, Mare Island. She was struck from the Naval Register on 15 October 1976, and transferred to the Maritime Administration (MARAD), 29 July 1992. The ship was sold for scrapping on 8 September 1993, for $353,725, to California Imports and Exports and towed to Shanghai, China for scrapping.

== Awards ==
Colonial received seven battle stars for Korean War service and six campaign stars for Vietnam War service.
