= Ashland-class dock landing ship =

WWII era built class of ships

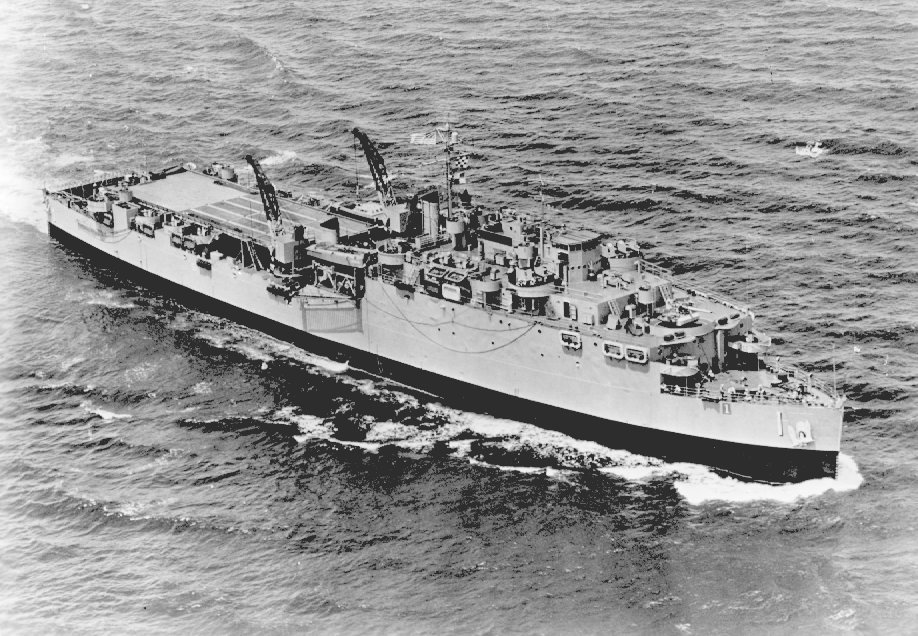
- USS Ashland underway off Cape Henry, Virginia, 20 May 1953

Class overview
- Builders: Moore Dry Dock Company
- Operators: United States Navy; Republic of China Navy; Argentine Navy
- Succeeded by: Casa Grande class
- In commission: 1943–1985
- Planned: 8
- Completed: 8
- Retired: 8

General characteristics
- Type: Dock landing ship
- Displacement: 4,032 tons (light draft), 7,930 tons (loaded)
- Length: 457 ft 9 in (139.52 m)
- Beam: 72 ft 2 in (22.00 m)
- Draft: 15 ft 10 in (4.83 m) max
- Propulsion: 2 Babcock & Wilcox boilers, oil-fired; 2 Skinner Uni-Flow reciprocating engines; Twin screws
- Speed: 17 knots (31 km/h; 20 mph)
- Range: 8,000 nmi (15,000 km; 9,200 mi) at 15 knots (28 km/h; 17 mph)
- Complement: 254
- Armament: 1 × 5 in/38 cal. DP gun; 2 × 40 mm quad AA guns; 2 × 40 mm twin AA guns; 16 × 20 mm AA guns

The Ashland-class dock landing ship were the first class of dock landing ship of the United States Navy. They were built during World War II. A dock landing ship (hull classification LSD) is a form of auxiliary warship designed to support amphibious operations. Eight ships were built for the United States Navy and they remained in US service until the 1960s. Two of the class were sold for export overseas, with one joining the Republic of China Navy and the other the Argentinian Navy. The two transferred ships stayed in service until the 1980s. All eight ships were scrapped.

== Design and description ==
The Ashlands were the first dock landing ships designed and constructed for the United States Navy. Though initially the American planners had no interest in the ship type, a design was developed from a British Staff Requirement which called for a ship with a floodable deck aft to operate at least two British landing craft tank (LCT). The ship type was initially designated "tank landing carrier" (TLC). The dock landing ship was designed with the capability of moving smaller, pre-loaded amphibious warfare craft over long distances. The Ashland-class ships measured 454 feet (138 m) long at the waterline and 457 ft 9 in (139.52 m) overall with a beam of 72 ft 2 in (22.00 m) and a seagoing draft of 15 ft 10 in (4.83 m) and a maximum draft of 18 ft (5.5 m). The vessels had a light displacement of 4,032 long tons (4,097 t) and a full load displacement of 5,746 long tons (5,838 t). While loaded and seagoing, their displacement is 7,100 long tons (7,200 t) and 13,490 long tons (13,710 t) when the well deck was flooded down. They had a complement of 254.

The vessels were propelled by two shafts powered by two Skinner Uniflow reciprocating engines fed steam by two double boilers creating 7,400 indicated horsepower (5,500 kW). This gave the dock landing ships a maximum speed of 15.4 knots (28.5 km/h; 17.7 mph) and a range of 7,400 nautical miles (13,700 km; 8,500 mi) at 15 knots (28 km/h; 17 mph). (Note: Friedman has the Ashlands' maximum speed at 17 knots (31 km/h; 20 mph) but Couhat states 15 knots) In United States Navy service, the Ashlands were equipped with a single 5-inch (127 mm)/38-caliber gun, two twin-mounted Bofors 40 mm (1.6 in) guns and two quad-mounted 40 mm guns and sixteen 20 mm (0.79 in) Oerlikon guns. (Note: In United States Navy gun nomenclature, the "/38 caliber" denotes the length of the gun. In this case, the /38 gun is 38 calibers long, meaning that the gun barrel is 38 times as long as it is in bore diameter.)

=== Amphibious capabilities ===
Their well deck extended three-quarters the length of the ship and measured 337 ft 11 in by 43 ft 8 in (103 by 13.3 m). The stern gate that opened onto the well deck measured 19 ft (5.8 m). The original design called for the ability to transport 16 landing craft mechanized (LCMs), with each LCM able to embark a single tank. With four TLCs a medium tank battalion (comprising 48 tanks) could be transported. Furthermore, the ships had to transport the vehicle crews, numbering 280 troops and maintain a sustained speed of 15 knots at full load to keep up with the invasion fleets. The final design allowed for the ships to embark either two British 193 ft (59 m) Mark 3 landing craft tank (LCT) side by side or three US Mk 5 LCTs with one forward of the other two which were positioned side by side or 14 LCMs or 1,500 long tons (1,500 t) of cargo in the well deck. Furthermore, they could store 12,000 US gallons (45,000 L; 10,000 imp gal) of fuel for the vehicles also with accommodating the crews of up to 24 vehicles in addition to a headquarters staff. Beginning in November 1943 during World War II, a deck was erected over the top of the well deck which doubled the carrying capacity of light vehicles such as trucks and DUKWs. Further additions included the installation of a mezzanine or spar deck beneath the new deck and atop the well deck to increase the carrying capacity of small vehicles again, with the decks being connected by ramps allowing for the vehicles to be driven onto the ship via the stern.

== Ships in class ==
Ashland class construction data
Hull number	Ship name	Builder	Laid down	Launched	Commissioned	Decommissioned	Fate
LSD-1	Ashland	Moore Dry Dock Company	22 June 1942	21 December 1942	5 June 1943	22 November 1969	Stricken 25 November 1969
LSD-2	Belle Grove	Moore Dry Dock Company	27 October 1942	17 February 1943	9 August 1943	12 November 1969	Stricken 12 November 1969
LSD-3	Carter Hall	Moore Dry Dock Company	27 October 1942	4 March 1943	18 September 1943	31 October 1969	Stricken 31 October 1969
LSD-4	Epping Forest	Moore Dry Dock Company	23 November 1942	2 April 1943	11 October 1943	31 October 1968	Stricken 1 November 1968
LSD-5	Gunston Hall	Moore Dry Dock Company	28 December 1942	1 May 1943	10 November 1943	25 May 1970	Transferred to Argentina, 1970
LSD-6	Lindenwald	Moore Dry Dock Company	22 February 1943	11 June 1943	9 December 1943	30 November 1967	Stricken 1 December 1967
LSD-7	Oak Hill	Moore Dry Dock Company	9 March 1943	25 June 1943	5 January 1944	26 October 1969	Stricken 31 October 1969
LSD-8	White Marsh	Moore Dry Dock Company	7 April 1943	19 July 1943	29 January 1944	23 January 1957	Transferred to Taiwan, November 1960

== Construction and career ==
On 26 November 1941, eight LSDs were ordered for construction at the Moore Dry Dock Company yard in Oakland, California for the United States Navy. They entered service at the height of World War II and saw action in the Pacific theater, taking part in several major invasions including the battles of Saipan, Philippines, Okinawa and Iwo Jima. Following the war, the vessels were placed in reserve. During the war, the ability to transport smaller vessels such as PT boats or minesweepers sometimes led to criticism that the Ashland-class ships were not available for their primary jobs. Furthermore, the landing ship docks were fitted with repair shops and some acted as repair ships in forward areas. They were reactivated for the Korean War, taking part in fleet exercises. Epping Forest operated in Korean waters, taking part in minesweeping operations, the first for an LSD. In 1954, Belle Grove was part of the fleet monitoring Operation Castle, a nuclear test at Bikini Atoll and again in 1957 for Operation Hardtack I. In 1956, Ashland was re-configured to operate six Martin P5M-2 Marlin aircraft before being taken out of service again 1957.

In 1956 White Marsh was decommissioned, but remained in active service with a civilian crew as part of the Military Sea Transportation Service (MSTS). White Marsh remained in this service until being transferred to the Taiwan. Lindenwald also saw service with the MSTS but was reacquired by the United States Navy. Belle Grove and Gunston Hall operated off the coast of South Vietnam during the Vietnam War and performed several transport missions in support of operations there. Lindenwald also took part in the landings of US troops in the Dominican Republic in 1965.

=== Export ===
Following the Korean War, the Republic of China Navy sought to expand its amphibious capability in case an opportunity arose to invade mainland China. They acquired White Marsh on 17 November 1960 on loan and renamed the ship Tung Hai and gave it the pennant number 191. The vessel was later purchased outright in May 1976 and was renamed Chung Cheng with the pennant number 639. Chung Cheng was discarded in 1988.

On 24 April 1970, Argentina purchased Gunston Hall, renaming the ship Candido de Lasala with the pennant number Q43, later B10. Candido de Lasala was used both as a landing ship dock and as a depot ship for small craft. The vessel was deleted in 1982.

== Gallery ==
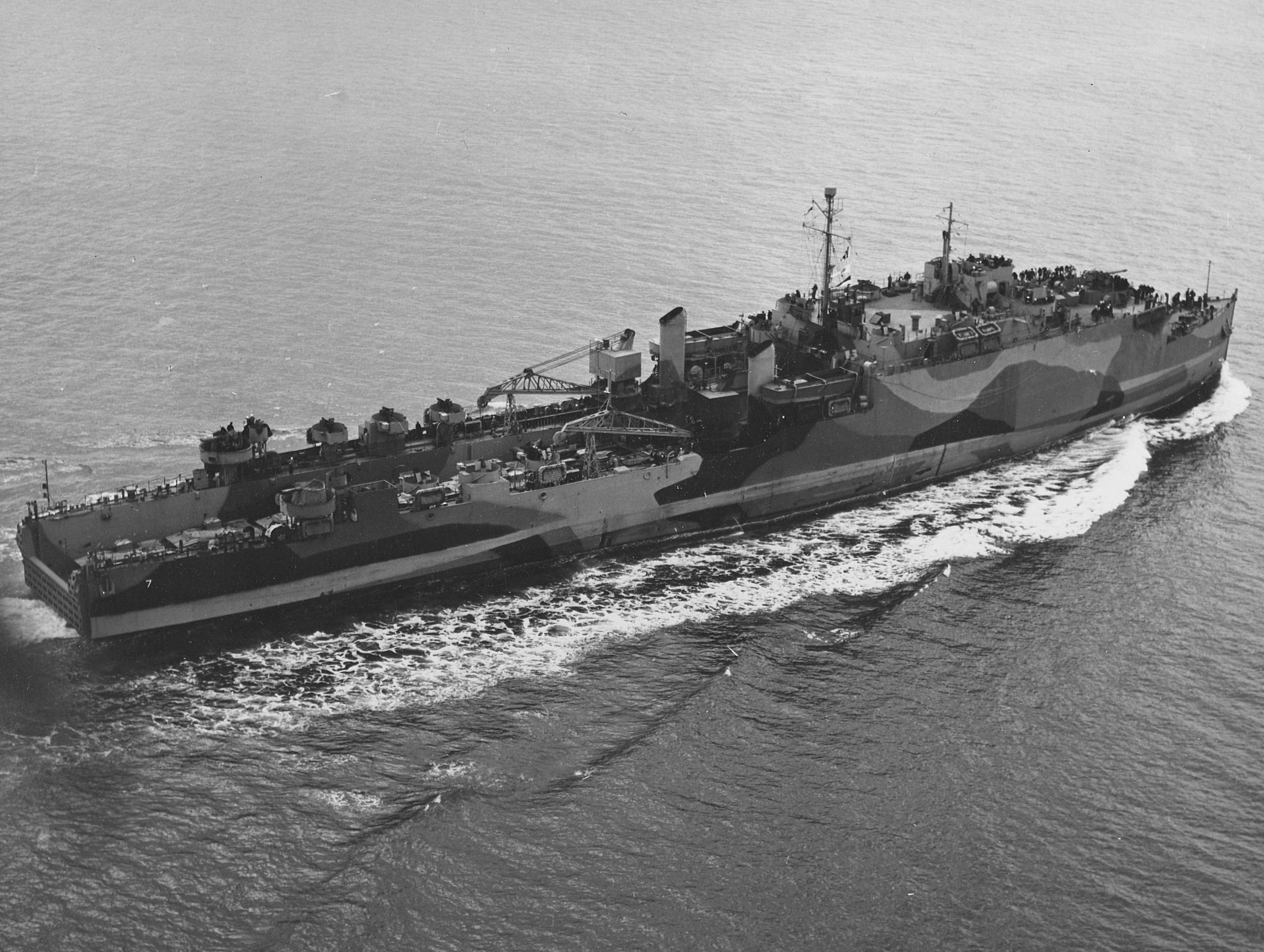
USS Oak Hill (LSD-7) underway off San Francisco in April 1944

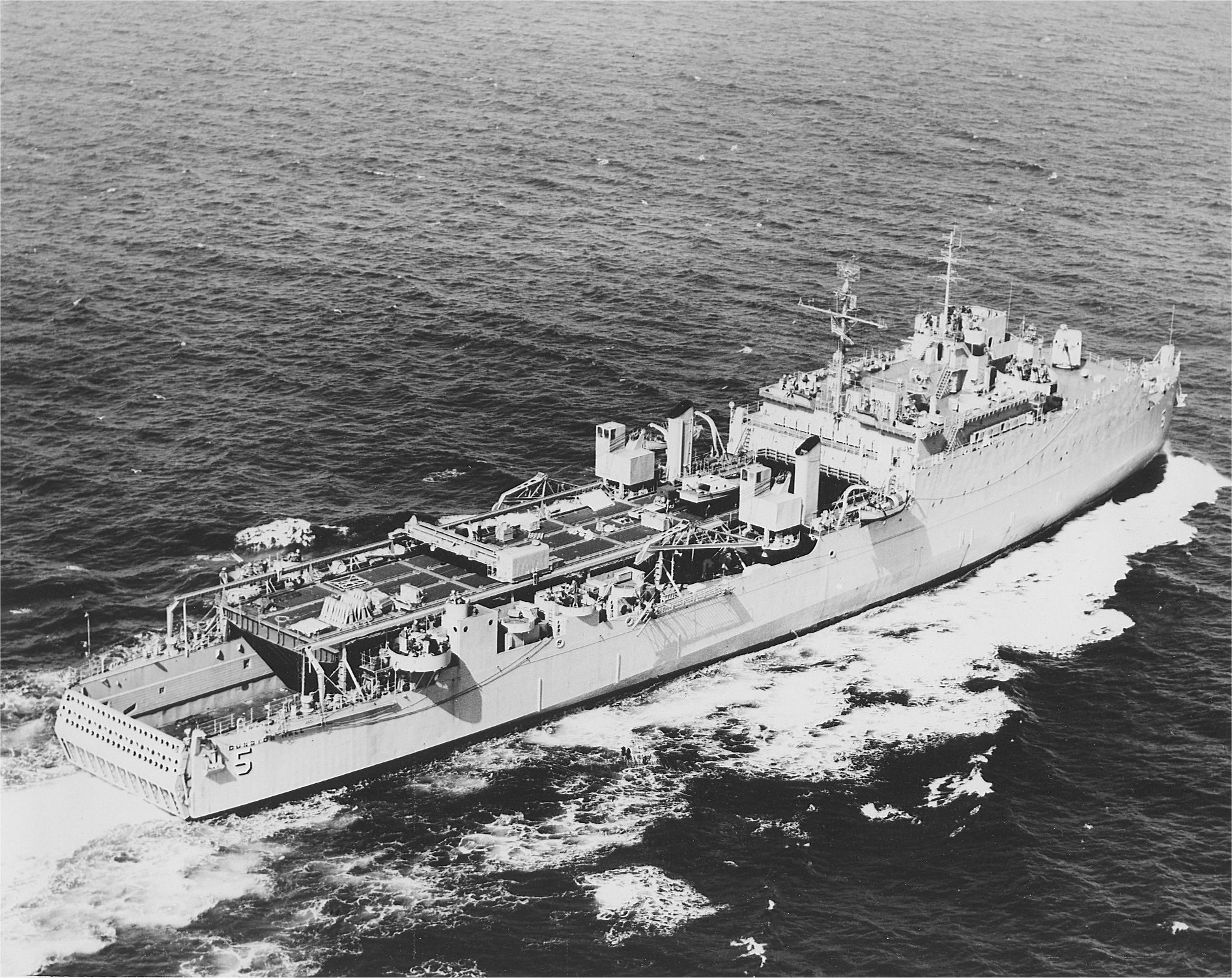
USS Gunston Hall (LSD-5) underway, soon after recommissioning in March 1949

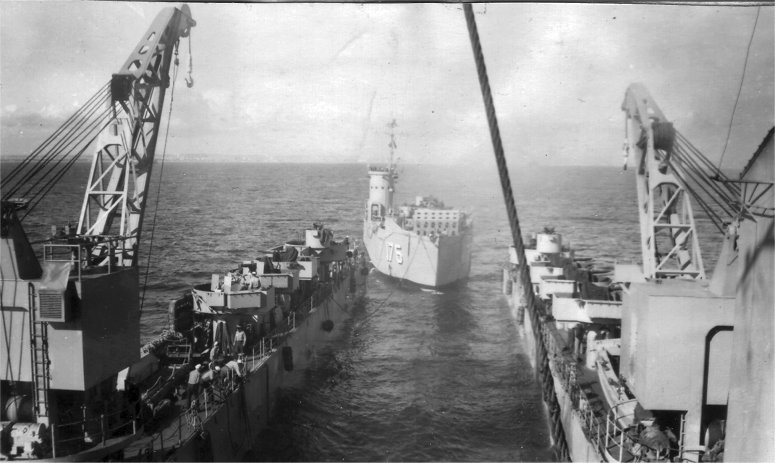
LSM-175 about to enter the well of USS Carter Hall (LSD-3) in San Diego Bay, Spring 1951

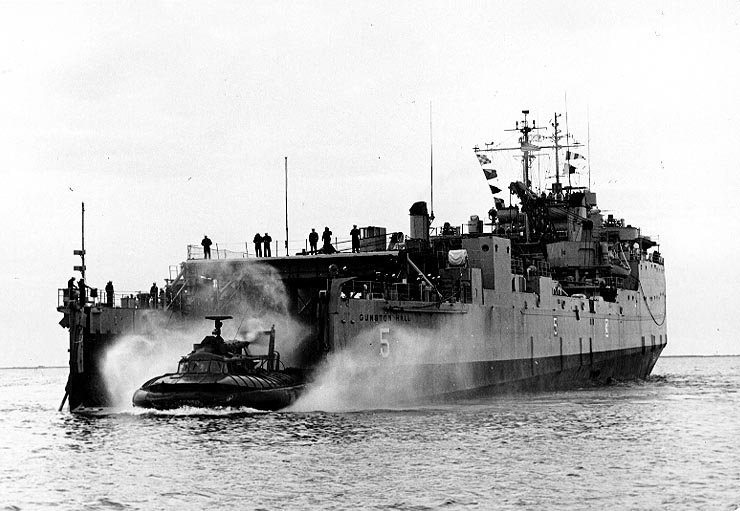
USS Gunston Hall (LSD-5) launches PACV c. 1967
