= Casa Grande-class dock landing ship =

1944 class of British/American dock landing ships

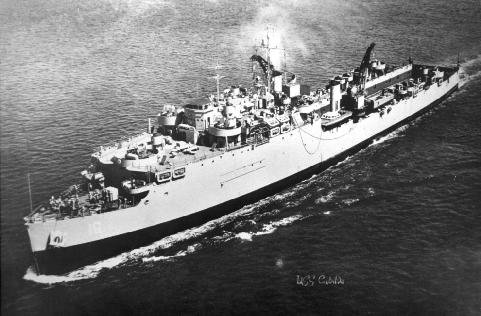
- USS Cabildo c. 1950s

Class overview
- Name: Casa Grande class
- Builders: Newport News; Boston Navy Yard; Gulf Shipbuilding; Philadelphia Naval Yard
- Operators: Royal Navy; United States Navy; Spanish Navy; Hellenic Navy; French Navy; Republic of China Navy
- Preceded by: Ashland-class dock landing ship
- Succeeded by: Thomaston-class dock landing ship
- Planned: 19
- Completed: 17
- Canceled: 2
- Retired: 17

General characteristics
- Type: Dock landing ship
- Displacement: 4,032 tons (light); 7,930 tons (seagoing)
- Length: 454 ft (138 m) at waterline; 457 ft 9 in (139.52 m) oa
- Beam: 72 ft 2 in (22.00 m)
- Draught: 15 ft 10 in (4.83 m)
- Propulsion: 2-shaft turbines, 2 boilers; 7,000 shp (LSD13-21 and 25-27); 9,000 shp (LSD22-24)
- Speed: 15.6 knots (18.0 mph; 28.9 km/h)
- Range: 7,400 nmi (13,700 km) at 15 kn (28 km/h)
- Boats & landing craft carried: One of the following arrangements: 3 × LCT Mark V or VI or; 2 × LCT Mark III or IV or; 14 × LCM Mark III or; 41 × LVT or; 47 × DUKWs
- Capacity: 1,500 tons of cargo (if not carrying boats)
- Complement: 17 officers and 237 men
- Armament: 1 × 5"/38 guns; 12 × 40 mm Bofors guns (2 × 2), (2 × 4); 16 × 20mm guns

The Casa Grande class was a class of dock landing ships used by the Royal Navy and the United States Navy during the Second World War. Nineteen ships were planned, but two, USS Fort Snelling and USS Point Defiance were cancelled before being completed.

== Design ==
The 'Landing Ship Dock' or LSD developed from a British staff requirement for a type of self-propelled drydock to transport beaching craft over long distances, that would in turn deliver trucks and supplies onto the beach. A flooding deck aft capable of holding either two of the larger British Landing craft tanks (LCTs) or three of the new US LCTs was included in the designs. With the option of fitting extra decks, large numbers of vehicles could be transported, and loaded into landing craft via ramps. Despite an initial specification for a speed of 17 knots (20 mph; 31 km/h), the LSDs were capable of only 15.6 knots (18.0 mph; 28.9 km/h).

== Service ==
The British initially ordered seven of the class from US dockyards, numbered LSD-9 to 15. Only four were delivered, numbers 9 to 12, while 13 to 15 were retained by the US Navy, which ordered another twelve to the design, but only built ten. In total thirteen of the ships served with the US Navy, while four ships served with the Royal Navy.

== Ships ==
=== United States Navy ===
Ship name	Hull number	Builder	Laid down	Launched	Commissioned	Decommissioned	Fate
Casa Grande	LSD-13	Newport News Shipbuilding, Newport News, Virginia	11 November 1943	11 April 1944	5 June 1944	6 October 1969	Sold for scrap, 6 April 1992
Rushmore	LSD-14	Newport News Shipbuilding, Newport News, Virginia	31 December 1943	10 May 1944	3 July 1944	30 September 1970	Sunk as a target, 16 April 1993
Shadwell	LSD-15	Newport News Shipbuilding, Newport News, Virginia	17 January 1944	24 May 1944	24 July 1944	9 March 1970	Scrapped, 2017
Cabildo	LSD-16	Newport News Shipbuilding, Newport News, Virginia	24 July 1944	22 December 1944	15 March 1945	31 March 1970	Sunk as a target, September 1985
Catamount	LSD-17	Newport News Shipbuilding, Newport News, Virginia	7 August 1944	27 January 1945	9 April 1945	31 March 1970	Sold for scrap, 4 December 1975
Colonial	LSD-18	Newport News Shipbuilding, Newport News, Virginia	1 August 1944	28 February 1945	15 May 1945	1970	Sold for scrap, 8 September 1993
Comstock	LSD-19	Newport News Shipbuilding, Newport News, Virginia	3 January 1945	28 April 1945	2 July 1945	20 April 1970	Transferred to Taiwan, 17 October 1984; sunk as artificial reef on 30 June 2015
Donner	LSD-20	Boston Navy Yard	1 December 1944	6 April 1945	31 July 1945	23 December 1970	Sold for scrap, March 2005
Fort Mandan	LSD-21	Boston Navy Yard	2 January 1945	2 June 1945	31 October 1945	23 January 1971	Transferred to Greece, 23 January 1971; sold for scrap, November 2001
Fort Marion	LSD-22	Gulf Shipbuilding Corp., Chickasaw, Alabama	15 September 1944	22 May 1945	29 January 1946	13 February 1970	Transferred to Taiwan, 15 April 1977; sunk as artificial reef, 9 December 2000
Fort Snelling	LSD-23	Gulf Shipbuilding Corp., Chickasaw, Alabama	8 November 1944		Never	Never	Completed as a ferry and renamed SS Carib Queen; sold for scrap, 25 June 1969
Point Defiance	LSD-24	Gulf Shipbuilding Corp., Chickasaw, Alabama	28 May 1945		Never	Never	Cancelled, 17 August 1945; broken up on slipway
San Marcos	LSD-25	Philadelphia Navy Yard	1 September 1944	10 January 1945	15 April 1945	1 July 1971	Transferred to Spain, 1 July 1971; scrapped in 1989
Tortuga	LSD-26	Boston Navy Yard	16 October 1944	21 January 1945	8 June 1945	26 January 1970	Run aground during storm, 15 December 1987; scrapped, 1988
Whetstone	LSD-27	Boston Navy Yard	7 April 1945	18 July 1945	12 February 1946	2 April 1970	Sold for scrap, 17 February 1983

=== Royal Navy ===
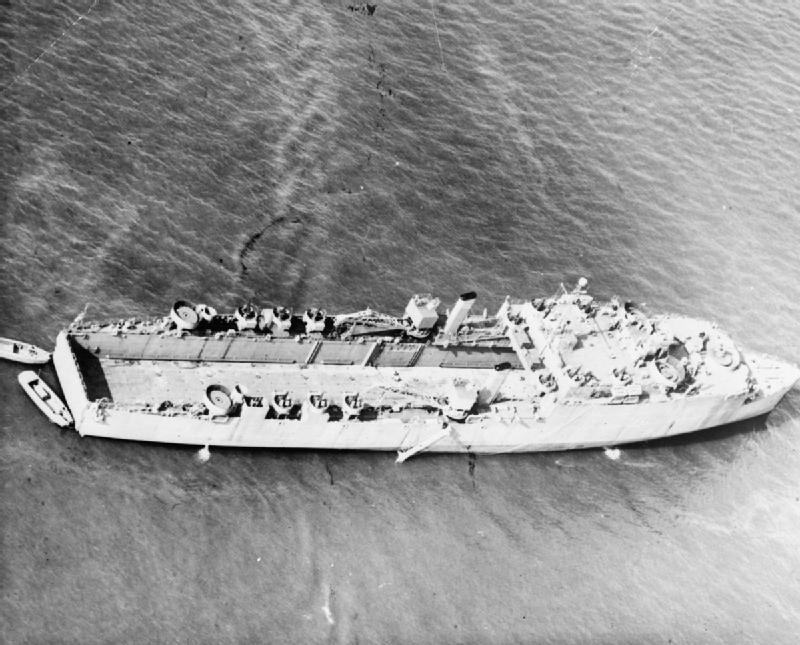
HMS Highway

Ship name	Hull number	Builder	Laid down	Launched	Commissioned	Decommissioned	Fate
Eastway	F130	Newport News Shipbuilding, Newport News, Virginia	23 November 1942	21 May 1943	14 November 1943	23 April 1946	Transferred to Greece, 1953; scrapped, 1972
Highway	F141	Newport News Shipbuilding, Newport News, Virginia	23 November 1942	19 July 1943	19 October 1943	23 April 1946	Sold for scrap, 17 December 1948
Northway	F142	Newport News Shipbuilding, Newport News, Virginia	24 May 1943	18 November 1943	15 February 1944	1946	Sold to a commercial interest, 19 March 1948; scrapped, 1975
Oceanway	F143	Newport News Shipbuilding, Newport News, Virginia	23 July 1943	29 December 1943	29 March 1944	1947	Transferred to Greece, March 1947; transferred to France, 1952; sunk as target, 10 February 1970

== Gallery ==
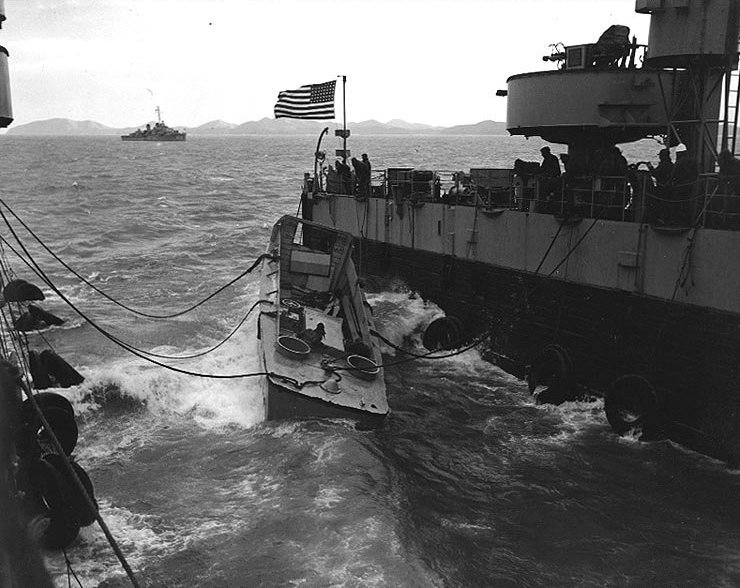
An LCVP bucks in the well of USS Catamount (LSD-17) during mine clearance operations off Chinnampo, North Korea, in November 1950

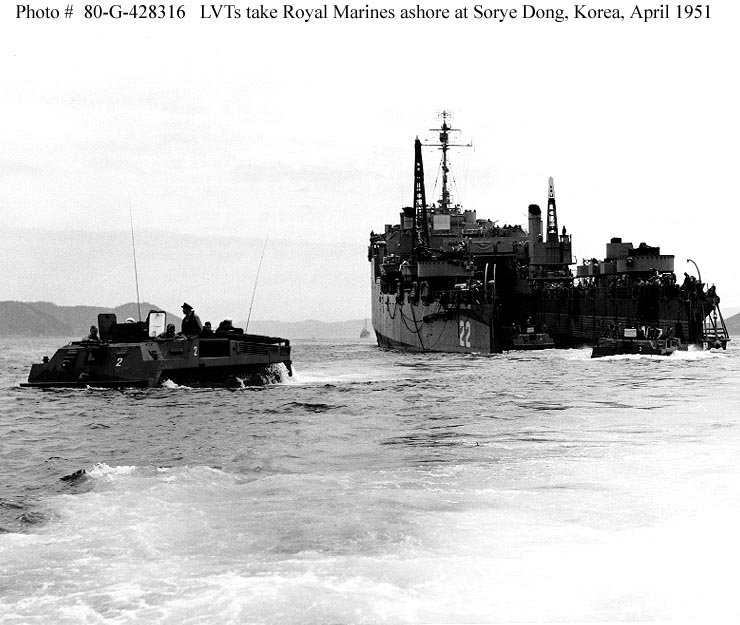
LVTs embarking British commandos leave USS Fort Marion (LSD-22) for the beach at Sorye Dong, Korea, on 7 April 1951

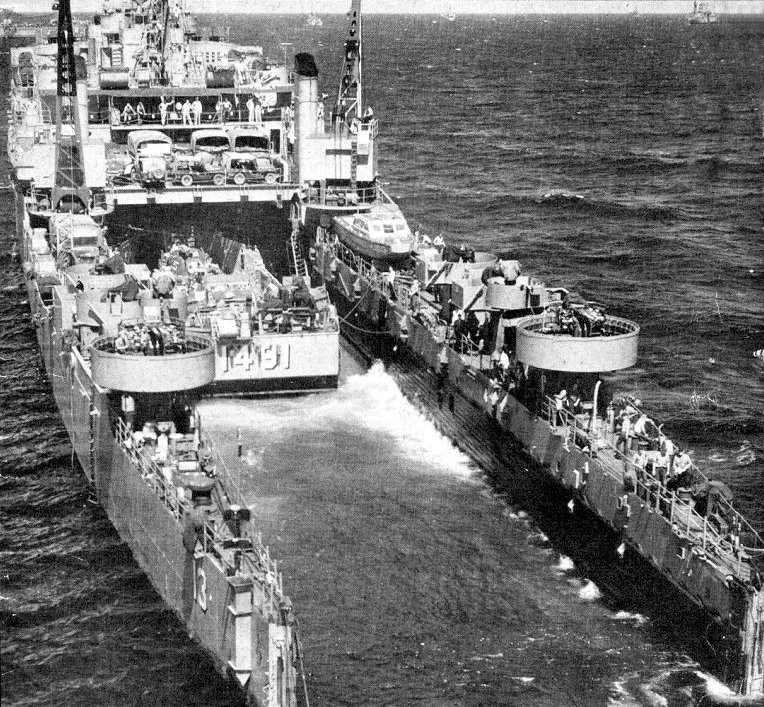
USS Casa Grande (LSD-13) discharging LCU-1491 from her well deck, circa 1957

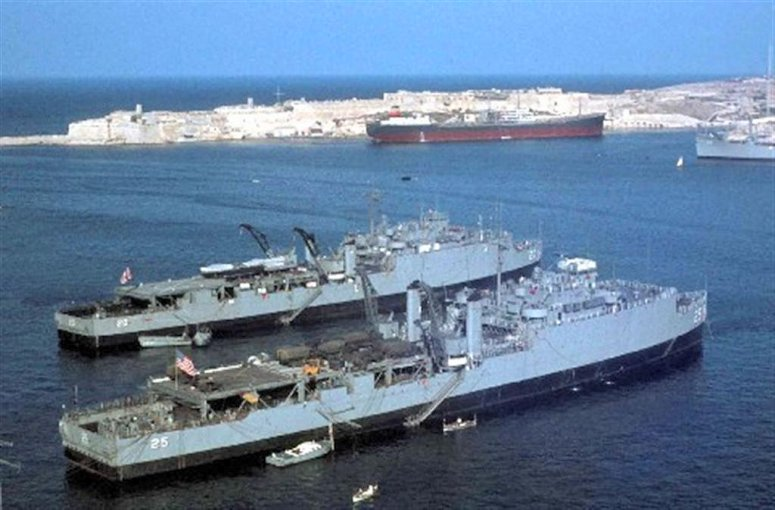
USS San Marcos (LSD-25, front) with USS Donner (LSD-20, rear)

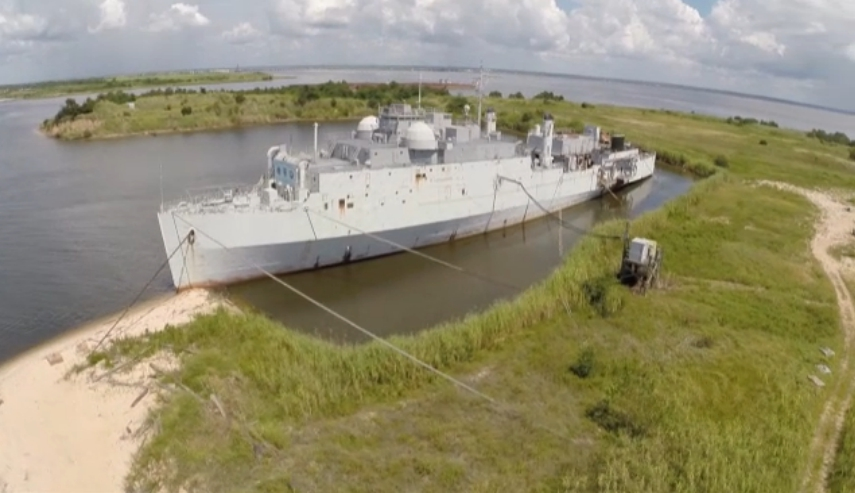
Decommissioned USS Shadwell (LSD-15) in Mobile Bay as a Fire Research asset, 2014
