= USS Lindenwald =

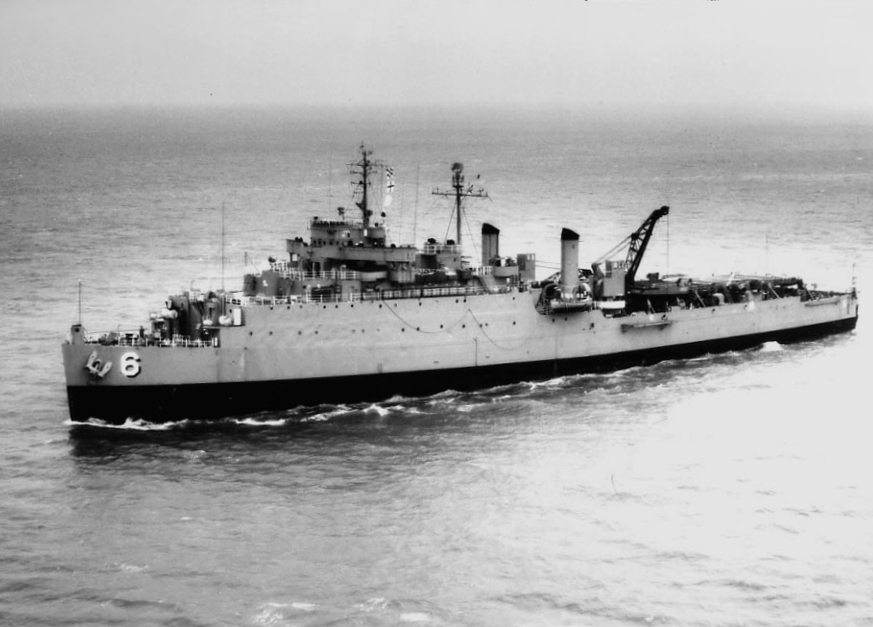
- USS Lindenwald (LSD-6) underway in Hampton Roads in 1965

History

United States
- Name: Lindenwald
- Namesake: Lindenwald
- Builder: Moore Dry Dock Company
- Laid down: 22 February 1943
- Launched: 11 June 1943
- Commissioned: 9 December 1943 – 5 April 1947, 18 February 1949 – 12 December 1956
- In service: 12 December 1956 – 1959
- Recommissioned: 1 July 1960 – 30 November 1967
- Stricken: 1 December 1967
- Fate: Sold for scrap, 25 September 1968

General characteristics
- Displacement: 7,930 tons (loaded), 4,032 tons (light draft)
- Length: 457 ft 9 in (139.5 m) overall
- Beam: 72 ft 2 in (22.0 m)
- Draft: 8 ft 2½ in (2.5 m) fwd, 10 ft ½ in (3.1 m) aft (light); 15 ft 5½ in (4.7 m) fwd, 16 ft 2 in (4.9 m) aft (loaded)
- Propulsion: 2 Babcock & Wilcox boilers, 2 Skinner Uniflow Reciprocating Steam Engines, 2 propeller shafts - each shaft 3,700 hp, at 240 rpm total shaft horse power 7,400, 2 11 ft 9 in diameter, 9 ft 9 in pitch propellers
- Speed: 17 knots (31 km/h)
- Range: 8,000 nmi. at 15 knots; (15,000 km at 28 km/h)
- Boats & landing craft carried: 3 × LCT (Mk V or VI); each w/ 5 medium tanks or; 2 × LCT (Mk III or IV); each w/ 12 medium tanks or; 14 × LCM (Mk III); each w/ 1 medium tank; or 1,500 long tons cargo or; 47 × DUKW or; 41 × LVT or; Any combination of landing vehicles and landing craft up to capacity
- Capacity: 22 officers, 218 men
- Complement: 23 officers, 267 men
- Armament: 1 × 5 in / 38 cal. DP gun; 2 × 40 mm quad AA guns; 2 × 40 mm twin AA guns; 16 × 20 mm AA guns
- Aircraft carried: modified to accommodate helicopters on an added portable deck

USS Lindenwald (LSD-6) was an Ashland-class dock landing ship of the United States Navy, named in honor of Lindenwald, the New York estate of President Martin Van Buren (1782–1862).

Lindenwald was authorized as a Mechanized Artillery Transport, APM-6; reclassified LSD-6 on 1 July 1942; laid down 22 February 1943 by Moore Dry Dock Co., Oakland, California; launched on 11 June 1943, sponsored by Mrs. Wilbur M. Lockhart and commissioned on 9 December 1943.

== World War II ==
=== Central Pacific campaigns ===
After shakedown off San Francisco, the new landing ship dock departed San Diego 27 December 1943 loaded with LCTs for docking and undocking trials in Maalaea Bay, Hawaii. Following 18 days of intensive training, Lindenwald sortied from Pearl Harbor with the Southern Transport Group for the invasion of the Marshall Islands on 22 January 1944 with 18 tank-carrying LCMs stowed in her well deck. Arriving off Kwajalein late evening 31 January, she launched the LCMs at dawn the next mornIng. Six days later, the ship loaded 54 LVTs and sailed for the Ellice Islands en route to Guadalcanal.

Anchoring off Guadalcanal on 23 February, she received calls from Admiral William F. Halsey and Maj. Gen. Roy S. Geiger, USMC. During March she made two runs from Guadalcanal carrying boats and marines for the daring invasion of Emirau Island, just 150 miles north of the Japanese stronghold at Rabaul. She spent April and May in Hawaiian waters, training with marines, then departed 30 May for Eniwetok en route to the invasion of Saipan. Lindenwald arrived the morning of D-Day, 15 June, and debarked LCMs preloaded with tanks and men of the 2d Marine Division. The ship then stood off Saipan while on the beaches the marines overcame tough opposition with naval gunfire and air support. Lindenwald departed for San Francisco 22 June and arrived 11 July, touching Pearl Harbor en route to unload boats and marine casualties.

=== Philippine and Okinawa campaigns ===
Departing the West Coast only 10 days after arrival, Lindenwald loaded boats at Pearl Harbor and steamed for the Admiralties to make final preparations for the invasion of Leyte. She left Manus Island for Leyte on 14 October and anchored in the LSD launching area 20 October. The next day, she quickly unloaded boats and got underway for Hollandia, New Guinea, to carry General MacArthur's rear echelon to the new headquarters at Leyte. For the next two months, Lindenwald carried troops and equipment from New Guinea to Manus and Leyte.

With Leyte secured, Lindenwald prepared for the invasion at Lingayen Gulf, about 150 miles north of Manila. as the Navy leapfrogged toward Japan. The ship departed Manus for Lingayen on 31 December. En route, January, four suicide planes attacked the formation. One crashed the port side of escort carrier Kitkun Bay. Formation antiaircraft fire splashed or diverted the others. The action continued with increased fury the next day. As the LSDs launched boats, Columbia was crashed just 1,000 yards from Lindenwald. That afternoon an enemy bomber damaged HMAS Australia. Nevertheless, the operation was successful. On 10 January the ship steamed for Wake Island to get reinforcements and returned to Lingayen on the 27th. Departing immediately, she picked up more men and equipment from Biak Island and returned again to Lingayen 11 February. Shoving off 13 February, she arrived Guam on the 24th, then proceeded to Milne Bay, New Guinea, loaded 38 boats, and steamed for Leyte. Arriving 12 March, she reported to Task Force 51 (TF 51) under Vice Admiral Richmond K. Turner and began preparations for the upcoming Okinawa campaign.

Lindenwald sailed due north from San Pedro Bay, Leyte, for Okinawa on 26 March and arrived 1 April. She remained off Okinawa for 92 days, docking, repairing, and servicing landing craft damaged by enemy gunfire or the heavy surf. During this period, the ship repaired 452 boats. Enemy harassment twice threatened to cut short her busy career. Early morning 27 May, after suicide planes crashed into two sister auxiliary ships, Lindenwald splashed an enemy aircraft before it could crash nearby Carina. Two weeks later, a murderous barrage from Lindenwald diverted an incoming suicide plane just enough to escape disaster. It barely missed the radar mast and splashed 500 yards off the bow.

With the liberation of Okinawa completed, Lindenwald sailed for San Francisco on 1 July and pulled in three weeks later. After a 2-month overhaul, she made a fast run to Pearl Harbor, then sailed via the Panama Canal for Galveston, Texas, and transport duty in the Gulf of Mexico.

== 1946–1954 ==
She steamed from New Orleans for Bremerhaven on 24 June 1946, touching Liberia, Casablanca, and Le Havre to debark men and supplies. Leaving northern Germany on 18 August, Lindenwald arrived Norfolk the 30th, stayed nine days and sailed for San Francisco, arriving 30 September. The ship decommissioned 5 April 1947 and joined the Pacific Reserve Fleet at San Francisco.

Lindenwald recommissioned 18 February 1949 and operated off the West Coast until 26 November, then steamed to Norfolk for amphibious duty, arriving 13 December. For the next three years, she made yearly voyages to the Caribbean and north to Newfoundland, Labrador, and Thule Air Base, Greenland. On 8 September 1953, Lindenwald departed Norfolk with Amphibious Group 4 (PhibGroup 4) en route the Mediterranean. She arrived at Algiers on 23 September, departed a week later for Crete, and spent October conducting amphibious exercises with the U.S. 6th Fleet in the Aegean Sea. Returning to the western Mediterranean, she visited ports in France, Italy, and Spain during late 1953, departing Oran for Norfolk 24 January 1954.

== 1954–1958 ==
During the following three years, Lindenwald made another European voyage and spent each summer operating in the icy waters off Greenland with the Military Sea Transportation Service (MSTS). May 1955, she spent time re supplying the DEW Line in the area of Eskimo Point up to Nov 1955. Lilly noticed the ship did not have a motto or plaque, so he created one with the motto Illigitimas non Carborundum ("don't let the bastards get you down") which BUSHIPS approved, perhaps without knowing the translation. HU-2 Fleet Angels was attached to the Lindenwald for search & rescue duties. Decommissioned 12 December 1956, she was transferred to MSTS the same date and was placed in service as USNS Lindenwald (T-LSD-6), and assigned to MSTS, Atlantic.

As a unit of MSTS, she made supply runs to bases in northern Greenland and the Arctic until mid-October 1958. Lindenwald then departed the East Coast of Greenland on one of her supply runs. En route, she ran into an Arctic storm. During the storm, she lost her steering controls and lay helpless for several hours. A distress signal was sent out and picked up by USNS Chattahoochee (T-AOG-82) which shortly arrived on the scene and towed Lindenwald to a safe anchorage. With her steering controls repaired, but with a noticeable list she sailed for New York City for further repairs, upon completion of which she was placed in MSTS Ready Reserve.

== 1959–1967 ==
Reacquired by the Navy early the next year, she recommissioned on 1 July 1960 and was assigned to the Amphibious Force, U.S. Atlantic Fleet. Besides extensive training duties with the Amphibious Forces, the ship also played a vital peacekeeping role during the volatile 1960s. She helped stabilize the Caribbean area during the Dominican Republic revolt of November 1961. From 14 February to 16 June 1962, the ship again patrolled the Mediterranean with the 6th Fleet. When President John F. Kennedy ordered the quarantine of Cuba in the fall of 1962, Lindenwald policed the area around Puerto Rico.

After spending most of 1963 in Arctic waters, the ship displayed her combat readiness in Operation "Quick Kick" during April 1964 and again that summer with the transatlantic amphibious exercise operation "Steel Pike I."

As civil disorder rocked the Dominican Republic in May 1965, Lindenwald steamed to Santo Domingo with peacekeeping forces for Operation Power Pack to help stabilize the island and make possible the establishment of a viable government. The ship departed Little Creek, Virginia for the Mediterranean in March 1966, returning on 16 November. During this deployment Lindenwald served as transport for the return of the deep submergence vehicles Alvin and Aluminaut to the United States after they successfully searched for a nuclear bomb lost in a B-52 bomber crash off of Palomares, Spain.

Until late 1968, Lindenwald alternated between upkeep, overhaul, and conducting amphibious exercises and training along the eastern seaboard and in the Caribbean. Lindenwald decommissioned at Little Creek on 30 November 1967 and was struck from the Naval Vessel Register on 1 December 1967. On 25 September 1968, she was sold to Union Minerals & Alloys Corp., for scrapping. Despite this, as late as 1977 she could be seen moored at Base Naval Rio Santiago (ARA/ Armada Argentina) near La Plata (República Argentina), probably waiting scrapping nearby.

Lindenwald received five battle stars for World War II service.
