= USS Ashland (LSD-1) =

WWII US dock landing ship

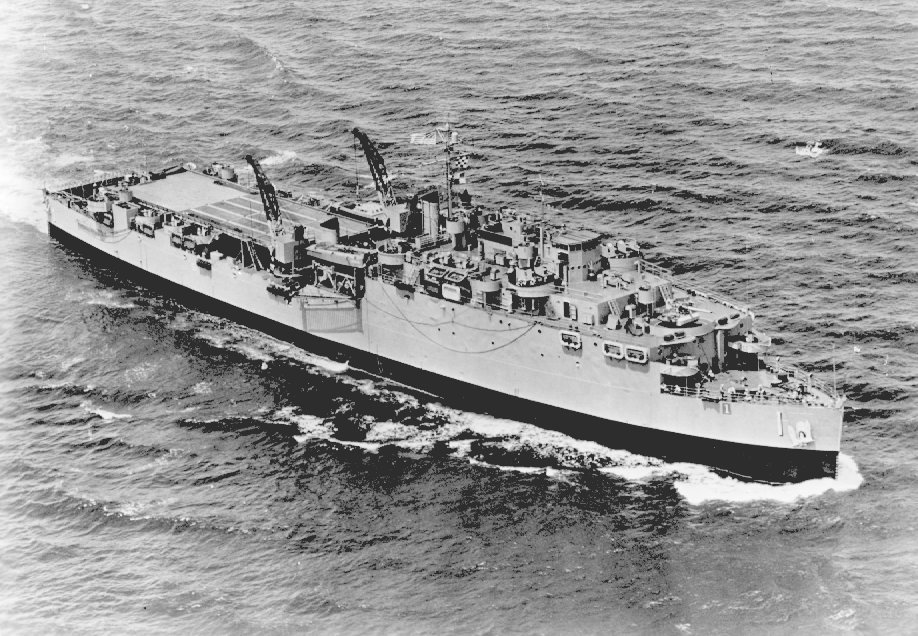
- USS Ashland (LSD-1) underway off Cape Henry, Virginia, 20 May 1953

History

United States
- Name: USS Ashland
- Namesake: Ashland, in Lexington, Kentucky
- Builder: Moore Dry Dock Company
- Laid down: 22 June 1942
- Launched: 21 December 1942
- Commissioned: 5 June 1943; 27 December 1950; 29 November 1961
- Decommissioned: March 1946; 14 September 1957; 22 November 1969
- Stricken: 25 November 1969
- Fate: Sold for scrap, May 1970

General characteristics
- Displacement: 4,032 tons (light draft), 7,930 tons (loaded)
- Length: 457 ft 9 in (139.52 m)
- Beam: 72 ft 2 in (22.00 m)
- Draft: 15 ft 5.5 in (4.712 m) fwd, 16 ft 2 in (4.93 m) aft (loaded)
- Propulsion: 2 Babcock & Wilcox boilers, oil-fired; 2 Skinner Uni-Flow reciprocating engines; Twin screws
- Speed: 17 knots (31 km/h)
- Endurance: 8,000 nmi. at 15 knots; (15,000 km at 28 km/h)
- Capacity: 22 officers, 218 men
- Complement: 23 officers, 267 men
- Armament: 1 × 5 in (130 mm) DP gun; 2 × 40 mm quad AA guns; 2 × 40 mm twin AA guns; 16 × 20 mm AA guns

USS Ashland (LSD-1) was the lead ship of her class—the first dock landing ship of the United States Navy. She was the first Navy ship to be named for Ashland, the estate of Henry Clay, in Lexington, Kentucky.

Ashland was laid down on 22 June 1942 at Oakland, California, by the Moore Dry Dock Company; launched on 21 December 1942; sponsored by Mrs. Jabez Lowell, the wife of Captain Lowell who was then the inspector of naval material at San Francisco; and commissioned on 5 June 1943.

== World War II ==
Following two months of trials, the dock landing ship loaded amphibious craft and personnel at San Diego, stood out to sea on 11 August, and headed west. After arriving at Pearl Harbor on 19 August, the ship paused to take on more cargo and sailed on 25 August for Baker Island. Ashland reached that destination on 1 September, unloaded her equipment, and returned to Hawaii on 27 September. Following voyage repairs, and the embarkation of Army troops, she sailed on 19 October for New Caledonia. At Nouméa, the ship loaded tanks and marines of the 2nd Marine Division and proceeded to Efate where she joined Task Force 53 (TF 53) to take part in the amphibious assault on Tarawa in the Gilbert Islands on 20 November 1943. Her duties were completed on 28 November and she set a course for Hawaii. She arrived at Pearl Harbor on 7 December and then commenced an availability period for voyage repairs and alterations.

On 11 January 1944, the vessel got underway for amphibious exercises off Maui. She sortied with TF 52 on 23 January for the assault on the Marshall Islands. From 1 to 5 February, Ashland was involved in assaults on Kwajalein Island and on several of the other small islands in the atoll that bears the same name. On 15 February, the ship embarked marines and equipment at Roi-Namur and proceeded to the assault on Eniwetok. The ship entered Eniwetok Atoll on 17 February and served as a repair ship through 29 February. On that day, she got underway for Pearl Harbor.

After a period of availability and operations in Hawaiian waters, the ship headed for the West Coast of the United States. She reached San Francisco on 1 April, began loading landing craft, and was back in Pearl Harbor on 17 April. Ashland then conducted training exercises off Maui before leaving Hawaii on 29 May for the initial assault on the Marianas. She launched boats for the invasion on Saipan on 15 June and then assumed duties as a repair ship. On 8 July, Ashland sailed to Eniwetok for fuel and supplies.

The ship's next assignment was the invasion of Tinian on 24 July. She left the Marianas on 28 July and returned via Eniwetok to Pearl Harbor. Ashland underwent repairs and held amphibious landing exercises before sailing with Task Group 33.1 (TG 33.1) for the assault on Yap and Ulithi. Ashland was diverted to Manus Island where she was assigned to TF 79 and prepared for the invasion of the Philippines. The ship sailed on 14 October and launched her boats on the 20th for the first assault against Leyte. Ashland left the combat area on 22 October and proceeded to Hollandia, New Guinea. There, she embarked troops for transportation to the Philippines; and, after delivering them to Leyte, she returned to Hollandia on 21 November.

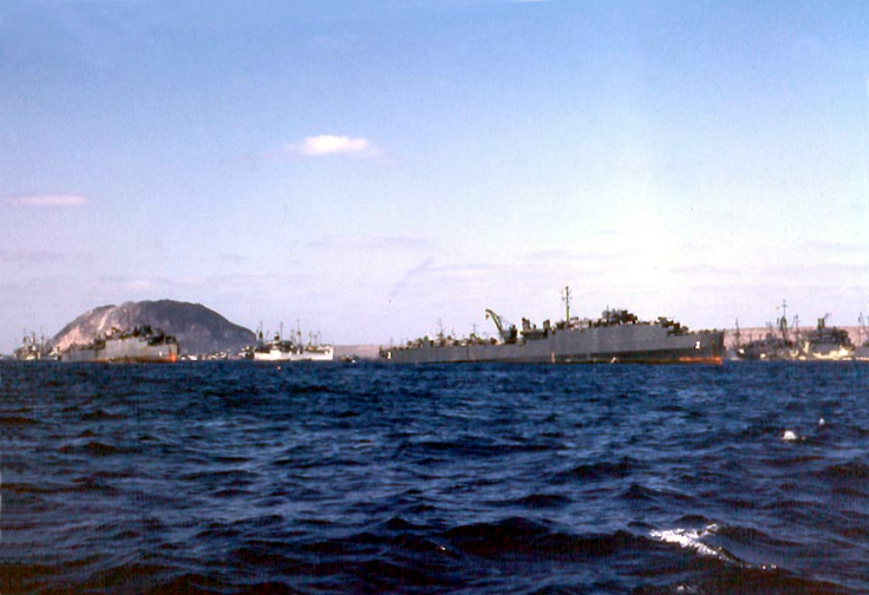
Ashland and USS Belle Grove off Iwo Jima, in 1945

Ashland headed for Cape Gloucester on 28 November for training exercises. Three days later, she got underway for Lingayen Gulf and the occupation of Luzon. All her equipment was unloaded by 12 January 1945, and Ashland retired toward Leyte. She continued on to Ulithi where she was reassigned to the 5th Fleet. The ship proceeded to Guam on 7 February, loaded 18 amphibious craft, and sailed to Saipan. There, she took on spare parts and more troops. On 12 February and 13 February, Ashland participated in landing rehearsals at Tinian. She sailed for Iwo Jima on 16 February and began launching her boats on the 19th. Despite continuing air attacks, Ashland's crew carried out repair work on schedule until she finally withdrew to Eniwetok on 31 March.

Ashland entered Pearl Harbor on 13 April and underwent an availability. She took on amphibious craft late in May and got underway for the Philippines on 3 June. She touched at Samar on 1 July to embark PT boats and their crews for transportation to Kerama Retto. The ship sailed on 3 July, unloaded her charges, and returned to Leyte on 10 July. She shuttled a similar cargo to Okinawa soon thereafter and arrived at Eniwetok on 7 August to refuel. The war ended on 15 August while Ashland was steaming independently to Espiritu Santo. After mooring there on 17 August, she proceeded with a load of PT boats to Okinawa.

Then she next sailed for Jinsen, Korea, and arrived there on 29 September. She remained at that port two days before getting underway for Leyte for a three-week availability before returning to Okinawa in late October. Ashland continued her duty of carrying and tending landing craft in the Far East until January 1946. Shortly thereafter she returned to the United States and was placed out of commission, in reserve, in March 1946 at San Diego.

== 1950–1957 ==
Ashland was recommissioned on 27 December 1950 and completed her shakedown training at San Diego in February 1951. She sailed for the East Coast in April and reported to the Maryland Shipbuilding and Drydock Company, Baltimore, Maryland, on 2 May for additional alterations. The ship's first assignment upon leaving the yard was Operation Bluejay, held in conjunction with the Military Sea Transportation Service (MSTS). From June to September, she was deployed to Thule, Greenland. In September, Ashland left Greenland and sailed to the Caribbean for two months of operations before returning to Norfolk in November for the remainder of the year.

The ship headed back toward the Caribbean in January 1953 for a month-long cruise. She arrived back in the Virginia Capes area in February and remained there until mid-June. On 14 June, Ashland commenced a trip to the North Atlantic and operated in those waters through mid-August. In September, she took on board two French submarines and seven French naval personnel for transportation to the West Coast. The vessel transited the Panama Canal on 10 October and touched at San Diego on the 14th. She returned to Norfolk in October and resumed service along the East Coast.

From April to June 1955, the ship underwent repairs at the Philadelphia Naval Shipyard and then proceeded to Newport, Rhode Island, for underway training. On 20 September, she got underway for Operation Sunec/Operation Bluenose with Task Force 150, which took her to Thule, Greenland, and ports in Labrador and Newfoundland. After returning in December, Ashland entered an upkeep period lasting through February 1956. She then received further repairs at Baltimore. In April, the ship took part in amphibious exercises at Vieques Island, Puerto Rico. Following this evolution, she made a reserve training cruise to Bermuda. In July, the vessel embarked Army personnel and equipment at NS Argentia, Newfoundland, and sailed on 19 July as part of the DEW line resupply mission. This operation lasted through 8 October.

On 1 November, Ashland was transferred to the control of Commander, Naval Air Force Atlantic, for alterations enabling the ship to tend aircraft. By July 1957, she was configured to handle six P5M-2 aircraft. The ship deployed to the Caribbean from 1 August to mid-September. At the conclusion of this assignment, the dock landing ship was decommissioned on 14 September 1957 and placed in the Norfolk Group of the Atlantic Reserve Fleet.

== 1961–1969 ==
Ashland was recommissioned on 29 November 1961. Assigned to Amphibious Squadron 4, she began a routine alternating operations off the East Coast with 6th Fleet deployments to the Mediterranean and to the Caribbean. In October 1964, she participated in Operation Steel Pike I, during which the ship served as a primary control vessel and boat repair ship. Upon completion of Steel Pike, the dock landing ship visited ports in Spain and Portugal before returning to Little Creek, Virginia, her home port, on 19 November.

Early in February 1965, Ashland took part in Operation FirEx, a joint Navy-Marine Corps exercise off the Puerto Rican coast and returned to Little Creek on 6 March. She got underway for the Mediterranean in June along with five other ships of Amphibious Squadron 4 and there served in six amphibious landing exercises. During this deployment, she visited nine European ports of call before returning to her home port on 3 November.

The ship was deployed to the Caribbean on 3 March 1966 as part of the Caribbean Ready Group and conducted numerous amphibious landings, including Operation Beachtime which involved over 40 ships of the 2d Fleet. Upon her return to Little Creek on 27 June, Ashland conducted upkeep until sailing for Narragansett Bay on 18 July for a series of training exercises. She was back in Little Creek later that month and went alongside Amphion for an availability. Ashland spent the next few months in training exercises and then entered Norfolk Shipbuilding & Dry Dock Company on 18 November for overhaul.

The yard work ended on 3 March 1967, but Ashland remained in the Norfolk area until 10 April, when she left for underway training at Guantanamo Bay, Cuba. She returned to Norfolk on 11 May but, four days later, reversed her course and proceeded back to Guantanamo Bay. Ashland touched back at home port in early June and engaged in local operations until 3 October, when the dock landing ship sailed for Vieques. She returned to Little Creek on 20 October and ended the year in an upkeep status.

Ashland was deployed to the Mediterranean on 3 January 1968. She relieved Donner at Almería, Spain, on 24 January and then held landing exercises at Aranci Bay, Sardinia, and Lovo Santo, Corsica. She visited Gibraltar; Valencia, Spain; Marseille, France; and Naples and La Spezia, Italy. From 29 April to 10 May, Ashland took part in NATO Exercise Dawn Patrol which also involved French and Greek naval forces. She returned to Little Creek on 30 May.

During July and August, the amphibious warship made visits to several East Coast ports and embarked American and Australian midshipmen for a training cruise. She spent September and October undergoing extensive repairs alongside Vulcan. On 12 November, Ashland weighed anchor for another Mediterranean tour. During the deployment, she repeated her routine of amphibious landing exercises and port visits before returning to the United States in late April 1969.

After 2 months at Little Creek, Virginia, the Ashland embarked on its final Mediterranean Cruise, sailing in early July for Rota, Spain. Then, on to Sardinia for exercises and a ship's party on the beach. From there, the ship travelled to Cannes, France, and then on to Valletta, Malta. After that, the ship travelled to Timbakion, Crete. It received orders to return to Little Creek while in Crete, cutting short its cruise, and the ship made its way back, encountering along the way a hurricane in roughly the area soon to be called the Bermuda Triangle. A safe return to Little Creek ensued.

There, it was found that the repairs she needed to continue efficient operation would be prohibitively expensive. Therefore, Ashland was decommissioned on 22 November 1969. Her name was struck from the Navy List on 25 November 1969. She was sold to N. W. Kennedy, Ltd., of Vancouver, British Columbia in May 1970.

== Awards ==
Ashland earned six battle stars for World War II service.
