= USS Casa Grande =

Dock landing ship of the US Navy

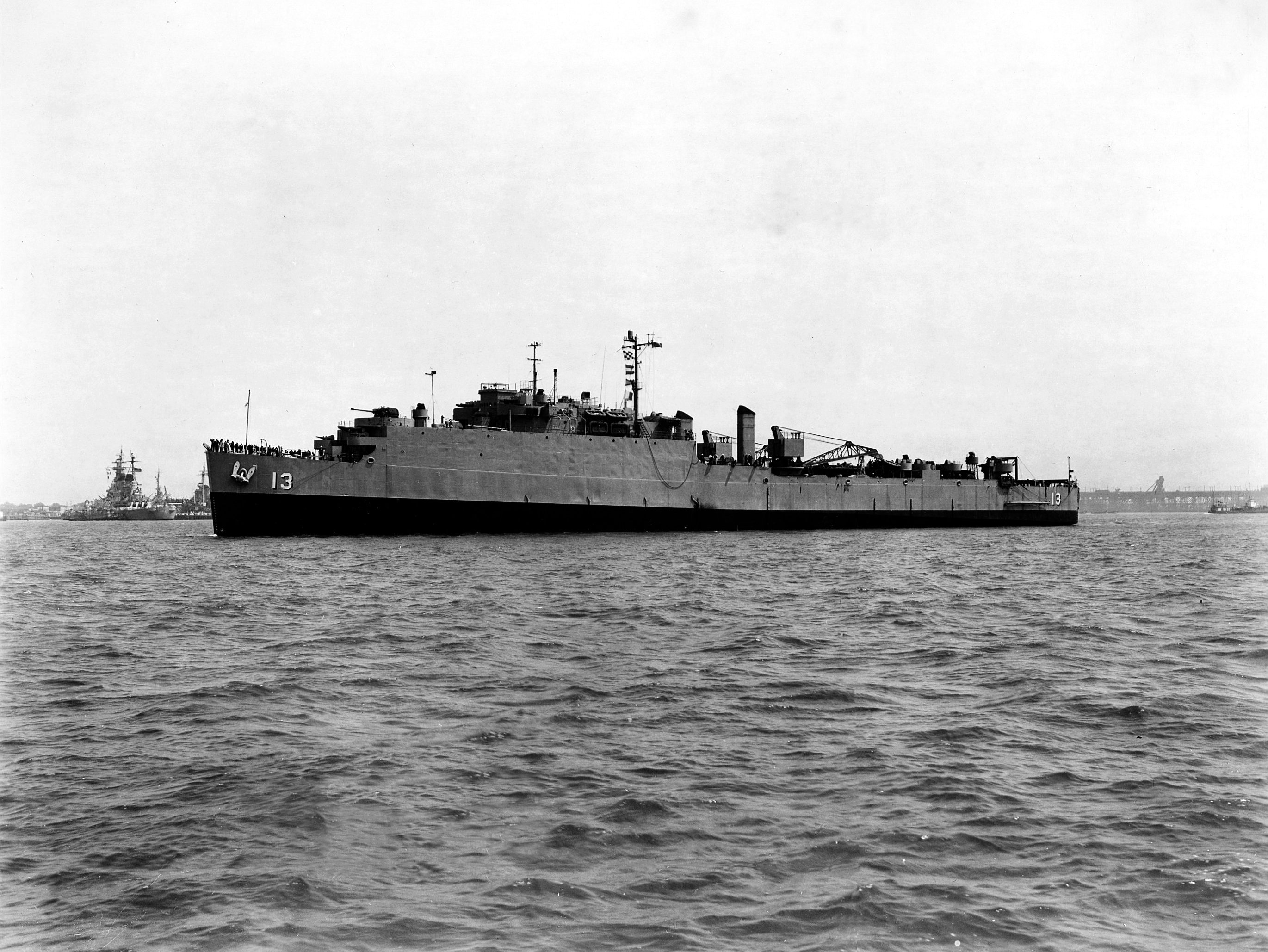
- USS Casa Grande at Hampton Roads in 1951

History

United States
- Name: USS Casa Grande
- Namesake: Casa Grande Ruins National Monument in Arizona
- Awarded: 10 September 1942
- Laid down: 11 November 1943
- Launched: 11 April 1944
- Commissioned: 5 June 1944
- Decommissioned: 6 October 1969
- Stricken: 15 April 1976
- Fate: Sold for scrap, 6 April 1992

General characteristics
- Class & type: Casa Grande-class dock landing ship
- Displacement: 7,930 tons (loaded), 4,032 tons (light draft)
- Length: 457 ft 9 in (139.52 m) overall
- Beam: 72 ft 2 in (22.00 m)
- Draft: 8 ft 2 1/2 in (2.502 m) fwd, 10 ft 1/2 in (3.061 m) aft (light); 15 ft 5 1/2 in (4.712 m) fwd, 16 ft 2 in (4.93 m) aft (loaded)
- Propulsion: 2 Babcock & Wilcox boilers, 2 Skinner Uniflow Reciprocating Steam Engines, 2 propeller shafts – each shaft 3,700 hp (2,800 kW), at 240 rpm total shaft horse power 7,400, 2 11 ft 9 in diameter, 9 ft 9 in pitch propellers
- Speed: 17 kn (31 km/h; 20 mph)
- Range: 8,000 nmi (15,000 km; 9,200 mi) at 15 kn (28 km/h; 17 mph)
- Boats & landing craft carried: 3 × LCT (Mk V or VI); each w/ 5 medium tanks or; 2 × LCT (Mk III or IV); each w/ 12 medium tanks or; 14 × LCM (Mk III); each w/ 1 medium tank; or 1,500 long tons cargo or; 47 × DUKW or; 41 × LVT or; Any combination of landing vehicles and landing craft up to capacity
- Capacity: 22 officers, 218 men
- Complement: 17 officers, 237 men (ship); 6 officers, 30 men (landing craft)
- Armament: 1 × 5 in (127 mm)/ 38 cal. DP gun; 2 × 40 mm quad AA guns; 2 × 40 mm twin AA guns; 16 × 20 mm AA guns
- Aircraft carried: modified to accommodate helicopters on an added portable deck

USS Casa Grande (LSD-13) was a Casa Grande-class dock landing ship of the United States Navy, named in honor of Casa Grande Ruins National Monument near Coolidge, Arizona.

The ship was originally authorized under the Lend-Lease Act as BAPM-5, the fifth of seven British Mechanized Artillery Transports, to be named HMS Portway (F144). Reclassified a Landing Ship Dock, LSD-13, on 1 July 1942, the contract for LSD-13 was awarded to Newport News Shipbuilding and Dry Dock Co., Newport News, Virginia, on 10 September 1942. Renamed HMS Spear, LSD-13's keel was laid down, on 11 November 1943. While under construction, LSD-13, Rushmore (LSD-14), and Shadwell (LSD-15) were reassigned back to the United States. The ship was renamed Casa Grande, and, as the first of her class in the U.S. Navy, gave her name to the class.

Casa Grande was launched 11 April 1944, sponsored by Mrs. G. Delapalme; and commissioned 5 June 1944.

== Service history ==
=== World War II ===
Sailing from Hampton Roads 19 July 1944, Casa Grande was delayed at Balboa, Panama Canal Zone for repairs en route to Pearl Harbor, where she arrived 21 August. Here she offloaded landing craft brought from the east coast, and loaded men and equipment for the invasion of Yap. However, upon her arrival at Eniwetok on 25 September, she was ordered to Manus Island to prepare for the Leyte operation. Assigned to the Southern Attack Force, she entered Leyte Gulf uneventfully, and took part in the initial assault on 20 October. Her men worked at fever pace under enemy air attack as they launched their landing craft and serviced other small craft engaged in this triumphant return to the Philippines, and on 22 October, she withdrew for Hollandia. During the next month, she made two voyages from New Guinea to Leyte, ferrying reinforcements, and evacuating casualties.

December 1944 found Casa Grande preparing for the second of the massive operations in the Philippines, and on 31 December she sailed in Attack Group "Baker" of Task Force 79 (TF 79) for Lingayen Gulf. First enemy contact came at sunset on 8 January 1945, as a small but determined group of kamikazes attacked. One of these broke through to damage the aircraft carrier Kitkun Bay severely, but Casa Grande came through unscathed, and joined in driving away the scattered individual enemy aircraft which pushed the attack onward.

Although sporadic attacks by Japanese aircraft and small ships tried to disrupt the landings, the long months of detailed planning bore fruit as Casa Grande and the others of her group carried out their landing assignments smoothly on 9 January 1945. She continued to operate in support of the invasion, plying between Lingayen, Leyte, and Morotai until 30 January. Casa Grande next cruised among the Solomons to load Marines, landing craft, and tanks for the invasion of Okinawa. She took departure from Ulithi on 26 March, and arrived off Okinawa at dawn of 1 April. Landing equipment and troops under the first of the kamikaze attacks which were to bathe the Okinawa operation in blood, she moved to Kerama Retto on 4 April to operate a small boat repair shop there until 3 June, when she sailed for a minor overhaul at Leyte.

Through July 1945, Casa Grande sailed between ports of the South Pacific and Philippines transporting men and landing craft, and on 23 July she sailed for dry-docking at San Francisco.

Between 12 September 1945, when she returned to Honolulu, and 20 April 1946, when she docked at San Francisco, Casa Grande supported occupation and redeployment operations in the western Pacific. She ferried landing craft and motor torpedo boat squadrons, calling at ports in the South Pacific, China, Japan, Korea, Okinawa, the Philippines, and Alaska. On 14 May 1946, she left San Francisco for Norfolk, Va., where she was decommissioned and laid up in the Atlantic Reserve Fleet, Norfolk 23 October 1946.

=== 1950 – 1969 ===
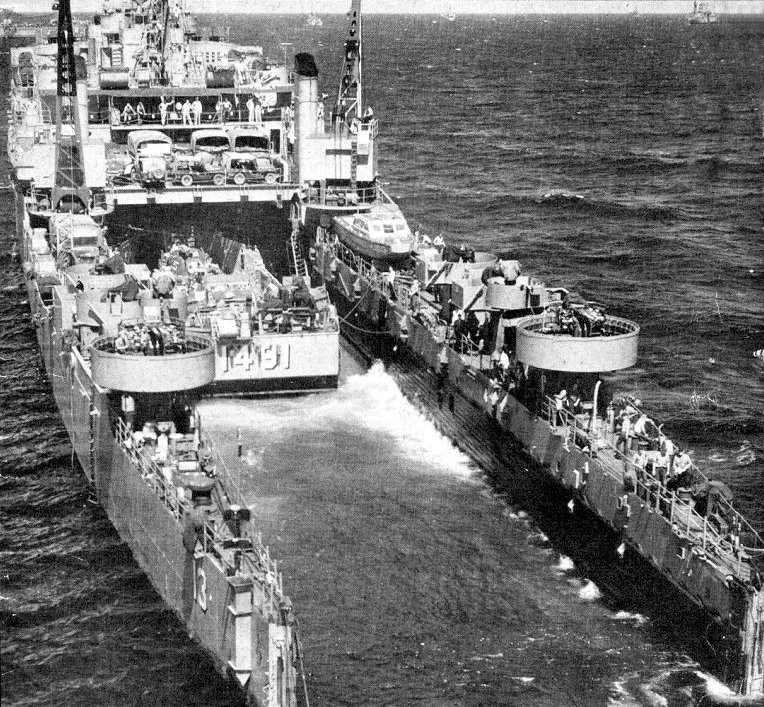
Casa Grande discharging LCU-1491 from her well deck, circa 1957.

With the outbreak of the Korean War, Casa Grande was recommissioned 1 November 1950 and based at Norfolk. Exercises off the east coast, and supply missions to Newfoundland and Greenland, as well as amphibious training in the Caribbean, formed the pattern of her operations through 1960. She voyaged to the Mediterranean for service in the 6th Fleet on three occasions.

She sailed for the first such deployment 20 April 1953, and on 13 August, was dispatched to the Ionian Islands to aid victims of earthquakes. At Cephalonia she established a beach center for medical supplies and provisions, and sent parties into the mountains to deliver supplies and bury the dead. When Casa Grande sailed from Cephalonia a week later, she left behind a hospital corpsman, as well as details of Marines who began rebuilding homes and roads. She returned to Norfolk from this cruise 28 October 1953.

Her next deployment to the Mediterranean took place between 29 July 1959 and 9 February 1960. On her return to the States she cruised off the east coast in amphibious exercises and participated briefly in "Project Mercury" (man in space) operations. Casa Grande sailed for 6th Fleet duty in November and finished 1962 in the Mediterranean as the command ship of Task Force 61 Amphibious Squadron Six.

Casa Grande was decommissioned on 6 October 1969, and transferred to the National Defense Reserve Force. The ship was stricken from the Naval Vessel Register, on 11 October 1976, and sold, 6 April 1992, for $270,000 to Baxter Shipping Inc., Burbank, California.

Casa Grande received three battle stars for World War II service.
