= USS Gunston Hall (LSD-5) =

1943 Ashland-class dock landing ship

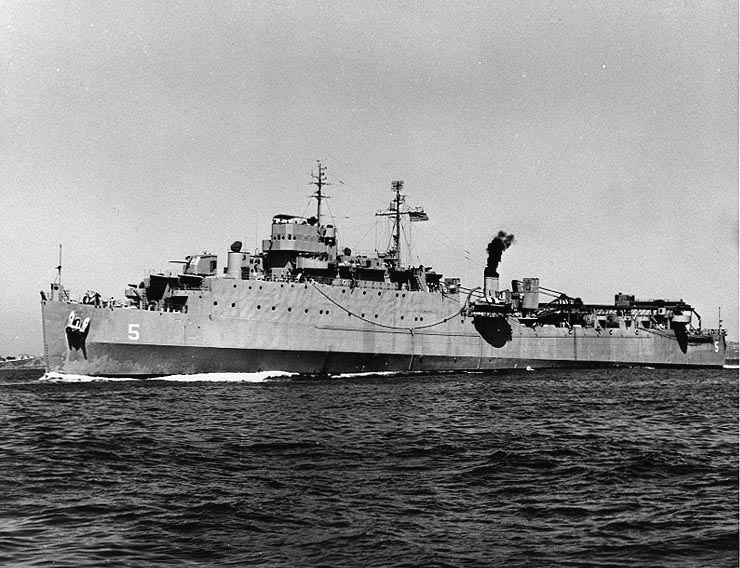
- USS Gunston Hall (LSD-5) c. the late 1940s.

History

United States
- Name: USS Gunston Hall
- Namesake: Gunston Hall
- Builder: Moore Dry Dock Company
- Launched: 1 May 1943
- Commissioned: 10 November 1943
- Decommissioned: 7 July 1947
- Recommissioned: 5 March 1949
- Decommissioned: May 1970
- Stricken: May 1970
- Fate: Sold to Argentina, 1970

Argentina
- Name: ARA Cándido de Lasala (Q-43)
- Decommissioned: 1981
- Fate: Sold for scrap

General characteristics
- Displacement: 7,930 tons (loaded), 4,032 tons (light draft)
- Length: 457 ft 9 in (139.5 m) overall
- Beam: 72 ft 2 in (22.0 m)
- Draft: 8 ft 2½ in (2.5 m) fwd, 10 ft ½ in (3.1 m) aft (light); 15 ft 5½ in (4.7 m) fwd, 16 ft 2 in (4.9 m) aft (loaded)
- Propulsion: 2 Babcock & Wilcox boilers, 2 Skinner Uniflow Reciprocating Steam Engines, 2 propeller shafts - each shaft 3,700 hp, at 240 rpm total shaft horse power 7,400, 2 11 ft 9 in diameter, 9 ft 9 in pitch propellers
- Speed: 17 knots (31 km/h)
- Range: 8,000 nmi. at 15 knots; (15,000 km at 28 km/h)
- Boats & landing craft carried: 3 × LCT (Mk V or VI); each w/ 5 medium tanks or; 2 × LCT (Mk III or IV); each w/ 12 medium tanks or; 14 × LCM (Mk III); each w/ 1 medium tank; or 1,500 long tons cargo or; 47 × DUKW or; 41 × LVT or; Any combination of landing vehicles and landing craft up to capacity
- Capacity: 22 officers, 218 men
- Complement: 23 officers, 267 men
- Armament: 1 × 5 in / 38 cal. DP gun; 2 × 40 mm quad AA guns; 2 × 40 mm twin AA guns; 16 × 20 mm AA guns
- Aircraft carried: modified to accommodate helicopters on an added portable deck

USS Gunston Hall (LSD-5) was an Ashland-class dock landing ship in the United States Navy, named in honor of Gunston Hall, the estate of George Mason (1725–1792), one of the Founding Fathers of the United States. Originally designated APM-5, Gunston Hall was launched 1 May 1943 by the Moore Dry Dock Company, Oakland, California, sponsored by Mrs. Harvey S. Haislip; and commissioned 10 November 1943.

Gunston Hall earned nine battle stars for World War II service and another nine battle stars during the Korean War. Sold to Argentina in 1970 and renamed ARA Cándido de Lasala (Q-43). Served in Argentine Navy. In 1981 she was decommissioned and struck.

== History ==
=== World War II ===
After intensive shakedown along the California coast Gunston Hall prepared to sail for the Western Pacific, where she was to participate in every major operation from February 1944 to the end of the war, 18 months later. Loading 225 men from the 4th Marine Tank Battalion and 2 amphibious units, as well as 15 LVTs, 15 tanks, 17 LCMs, and 15,000 gallons of gasoline, Gunston Hall departed San Diego on 13 January 1944. On D-Day for the assault on Kwajalein, 1 February 1944, she stood offshore to unload her cargo as the Marines stormed the beaches on Roi and Namur Islands. Gunston Hall remained in the area to repair small craft until 6 February, when she reembarked her former passengers and equipment and sailed to Guadalcanal via Funa Futi. The pattern she set here held for her participation in eight further key invasion efforts in the Pacific as the Navy "Island-hopped" Marines and Army troops ever closer to the Japanese home islands.

Through the rest of 1944, the versatile landing ship took part in the initial assault invasions of Emirau Island 20 March, of Hollandia on 22 April, Guam on 21 July, Peleliu Island on 15 September, and Leyte Island on 20 October. The last assault culminated in the momentous Battle for Leyte Gulf, one of history's greatest naval engagements. While not actually involved in an invasion effort, Gunston Hall trained troops and shuttled supplies and men from the rear islands to the staging areas.

In 1945 Gunston Hall participated in the initial assault landings at Luzon on 9 January, Iwo Jima on 19 February, and Okinawa on 1 April. After the first invasion waves went ashore at Okinawa, the Pacific's largest amphibious operation, involving over 1,200 ships and half a million men, Gunston Hall remained anchored at nearby Kerama Retto until 1 July to repair small craft. She was untouched by the enemy's fierce kamikaze attacks although she saw several other American ships hit and crippled.

Gunston Hall terminated her Pacific War duty 1 July 1945 as she sailed for a much-needed overhaul reaching Portland, Oregon on 26 July via Guam, Eniwetok, and Pearl Harbor. After a period of shuttling small craft along the West Coast, she anchored at San Diego in mid-December to repair small craft. Gunston Hall returned to the Pacific in 1946 to participate in one of the most significant series of scientific tests of the era. Departing San Diego 17 April, she reached Bikini Atoll on 6 May via Pearl Harbor for duties in connection with Operation Crossroads, the famous series of atomic bomb tests. Departing Bikini on 19 August, Gunston Hall returned to San Diego 3 October via Kwajalein and Pearl. Gunston Hall decommissioned 7 July 1947 at Terminal Island in San Francisco Bay.

=== Arctic operations ===
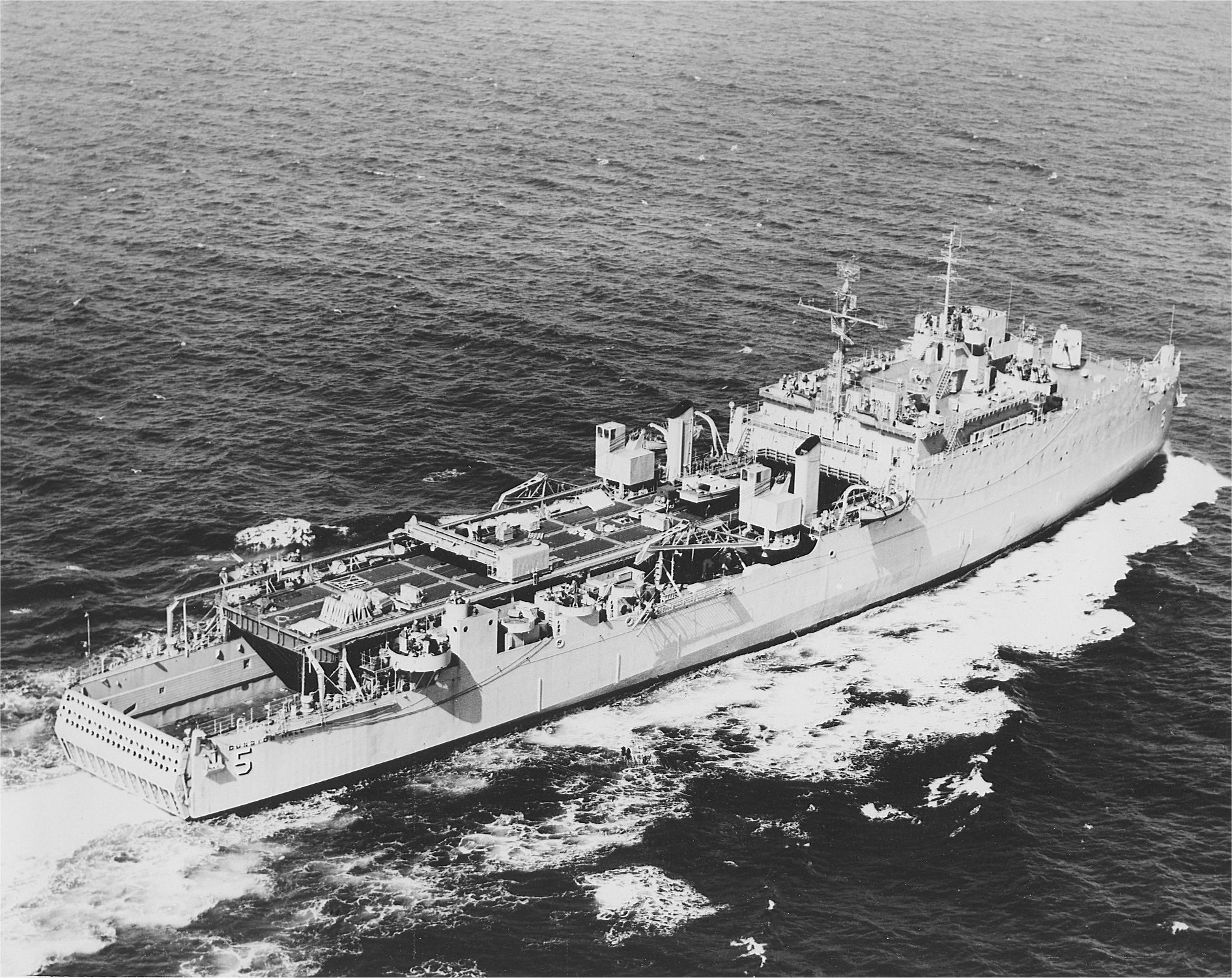
USS Gunston Hall (LSD-5) underway, soon after recommissioning in March 1949.

Conversion under project SCB 29 as an "Arctic LSD" at Puget Sound Naval Shipyard, Bremerton, gave Gunston Hall a reinforced hull and a greatly extended heating and ventilation system which would permit her to operate effectively in the Arctic. She recommissioned at Puget Sound 5 March 1949 and, after shakedown, sailed north to participate in Operation Miki in the Arctic Circle and later returned for Operation Micowex. Next training and development operations along the West Coast occupied her until the outbreak of war in Korea.

=== Korean War ===
With elements of the 1st Marine Provisional Brigade embarked, Gunston Hall departed San Diego 1 July 1950 and reached Pusan, Korea, via Yokosuka 3 August. Disembarking the Marines, she took aboard 30 stretcher cases and returned to Osaka, Japan. On 10 September Gunston Hall sailed from Japan to participate in the amphibious operation at Inchon, Korea, 15 September. After the Marines had landed midway up the peninsula, threatening to cut the communist supply lines to their troops at the tip of the peninsula, Gunston Hall made several shuttle trips to bring reinforcements. As the Korean War settled into its long and bloody pattern of near stalemate, Gunston Hall continued to shuttle troops and supplies between Japan and Korea. During an overhaul in the summer of 1952, she was fitted with a helicopter landing and launching platform large enough to accommodate nine "whirly-birds", the newest element in amphibious warfare.

The Gunston Hall was a busy ship during the war due to her many capabilities to carry landing craft, tanks, trucks, etc., along with their Army and Marine troops. She served several tours of duty as the mother ship for small mine sweepers in Wanson Harbor in North Korea. The Koreans always expected the United Nations to make a landing there, although they never did, and so kept the harbor fortified. The Koreans sowed the mines at night, and the small mine sweepers cut the mines and blew them up during the day. Also participating in the Wanson Harbor operations were such ships as the battleships Iowa and Wisconsin which along with numerous destroyers bombarded the coast line.

In April 1952 the Gunston Hall carried 15,000 prisoners in five trips from the major prison island of Koje-do to Ulsan and Cheju-do so as to split up the prison population in anticipation of demonstrations on May Day. The prisoners consisted of both North Koreans and Chinese and were guarded by ROK soldiers stationed around the well deck.

When armistice ended the actual fighting in Korea, Gunston Hall sailed to Cheju-Do, Korea, 4 September 1953. Remaining there until 22 September, she served in Operation Big Switch, the exchange of prisoners of war. She then settled into a schedule of annual cruises in the Western Pacific, which took her from San Diego to various Asian ports, interspersed with Arctic resupply cruises.

=== Vietnam operations ===
Gunston Hall was part of one of the Navy's greatest postwar humanitarian efforts in 1955 as she joined TG 90 (Rear Admiral Lorenzo S. Sabin) at Saigon, South Vietnam, for Operation Passage to Freedom. When the Geneva Accord of July 1954 divided the former French Indochina, over 800,000 North Vietnamese decided to cast their lot with the South rather than live under a Communist government. Since badly depleted French forces could not hope to effect the transfer of so many people, the U.S. Navy detailed nearly 100 ships to carry refugees and equipment from Haiphong to Saigon in a 9-month period. Gunston Hall made five coastal runs carrying heavy barges between 2 January and 26 February 1955. In all, the Navy evacuated 310,848 North Vietnamese as well as 68,757 tons of cargo and over 8,000 vehicles. Hard-pressed sailors feeding and clothing the ragged refugees were rewarded when many of the 184 children born during the Haiphong–Saigon passage were named after Navy vessels.

=== Cuba Missile Crisis ===
Gunston Hall's pattern of WesPac cruises and Arctic resupply missions was broken a second time in 1962. During the Cuban Missile Crisis, she embarked elements of the 5th Marine Expeditionary Brigade at San Diego and headed for the Caribbean, transiting the Panama Canal on 5 November. As the Soviets withdrew their missiles and the crisis passed, Gunston Hall transited the Canal again returning San Diego 15 December.

=== Vietnam War ===
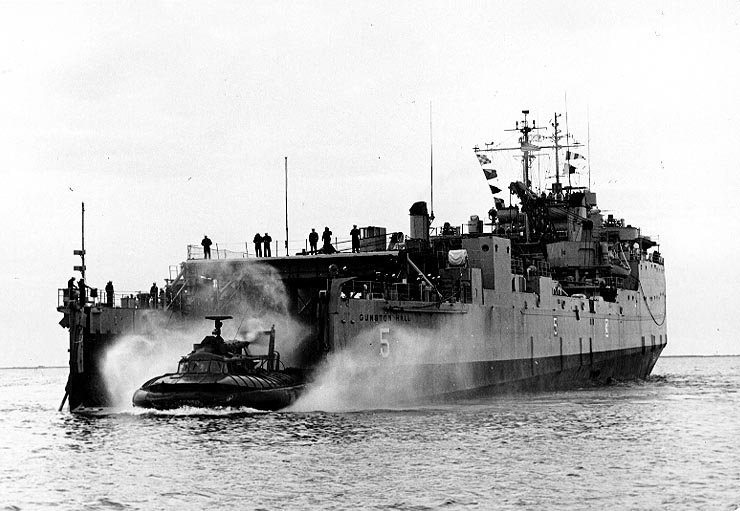
USS Gunston Hall (LSD-5) launches PACV c. 1967.

The veteran LSD sailed for the western Pacific 26 March 1963. After operations which carried her to Japan, Okinawa, Korea, Hong Kong, and several Pacific islands she returned to the West Coast 13 November. Following operations along the California coast, she departed San Diego on 6 November 1964 for duty with the 7th Fleet. Arriving in Subic Bay on 30 November, she was under way again a week later for Vietnam to support the fight to thwart Communist aggression.

Relieved 8 January 1965, she headed for Hong Kong, en route to Japan, arriving Yokosuka on the 24th. She visited Korea and Okinawa before returning to the battle zone. She unloaded cargo at Da Nang through 18 February, then headed to Okinawa for more supplies. She continued this pattern of duty shuttling between Pacific ports and Vietnam until departing Yokosuka for home on 6 June.

Reaching San Diego on 22 June, she prepared to return to the Orient. Sailing 6 August, she visited Hawaii, Okinawa, and Japan before returning to the West Coast 7 October.

After operations out of San Diego, Gunston Hall again turned her prow toward the setting sun 16 May 1966. She reached Chu Lai, Vietnam, 27 May and debarked the 9th Marine Engineers before sailing for Subic Bay to resume shuttling between Vietnam and nearby friendly ports, bringing materiel to the Allies. She participated in exercises "Hilltop VII" and "Mudpuppy I" in the Philippines before loading three experimental Navy Patrol Air Cushion vehicles on 15 December for transportation to San Diego. Back home early in January 1967, Gunston Hall prepared for future action.

== ARA Cándido de Lasala (Q-43) ==
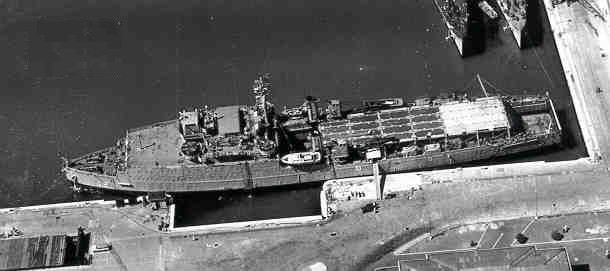
ARA Cándido de Lasala

Gunston Hall was sold to Argentina in 1970, under Military Assistance Program, renamed ARA Cándido de Lasala (Q-43), and used by the Argentine Navy to support the Marines. On 23 December 1974, in the English Channel, an explosion in her boiler room killed 2 sailors and injured 3. She was decommissioned in 1981.

== Sources ==
- Roberts, Stephen S. "U.S. Navy Ship Design Project Numbers, 1946-1979 ("SCB Numbers)".
