= HMS Oceanway =

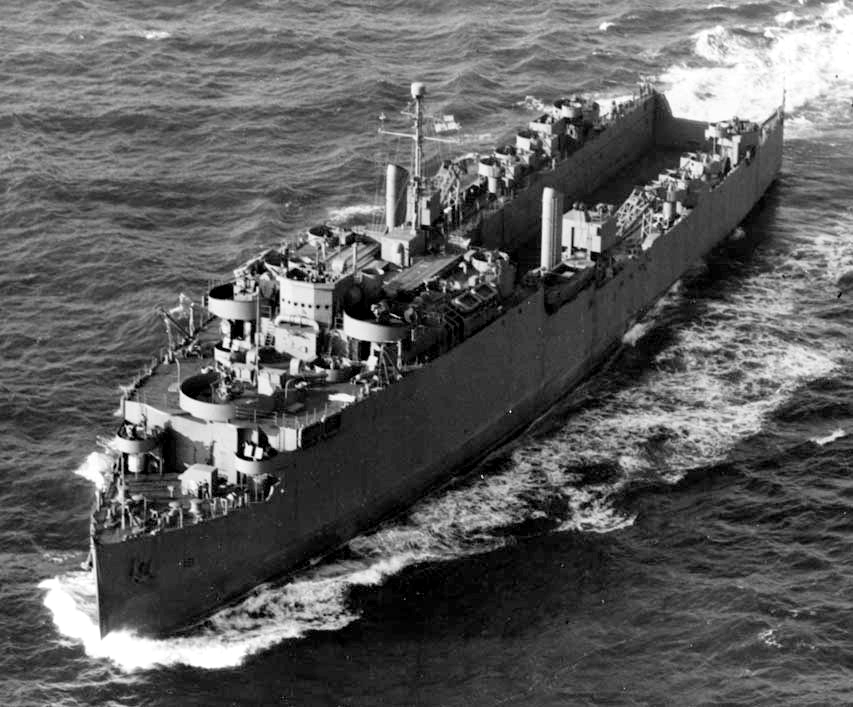
- HMS Oceanway (F143) off Norfolk, Virginia (USA), in April 1944

History

United Kingdom
- Name: HMS Oceanway
- Builder: Newport News Shipbuilding and Drydock Company, Newport News, Virginia
- Laid down: 23 July 1943
- Launched: 29 December 1943
- Commissioned: 29 March 1944
- Decommissioned: 1947
- Identification: F143
- Fate: Loaned to Greece

Greece
- Name: Okeanos
- Commissioned: March 1947
- Decommissioned: 1952
- Fate: Returned to the United States

France
- Name: Foudre
- Namesake: lightning
- Acquired: 1952
- Commissioned: 1952
- Decommissioned: 1969
- Identification: A646 (1952); L9020, (c. 1965)
- Fate: Sunk as target, 10 February 1970

General characteristics
- Displacement: 7,930 tons (loaded), 4,032 tons (light draft)
- Length: 457 ft 9 in (139.52 m) overall
- Beam: 72 ft 2 in (22.00 m)
- Draft: 8 ft 2 1/2 in (2.50 m) fwd, 10 ft 1/2 in (3.06 m) aft (light); 15 ft 5 1/2 in (4.71 m) fwd, 16 ft 2 in (4.93 m) aft (loaded)
- Propulsion: 2 Babcock & Wilcox boilers, 2 Skinner geared steam turbines, 2 propeller shafts
- Speed: 17 kn (31 km/h; 20 mph)
- Range: 8,000 nmi (15,000 km; 9,200 mi) at 15 kn (28 km/h; 17 mph)
- Boats & landing craft carried: 3 × LCT (Mk V or VI); each w/ 5 medium tanks or; 2 × LCT (Mk III or IV); each w/ 12 medium tanks or; 14 × LCM (Mk III); each w/ 1 medium tank; or 1,500 long tons cargo or; 47 × DUKW or; 41 × LVT or; Any combination of landing vehicles, amphibious and landing craft up to capacity
- Capacity: 22 officers, 218 men
- Complement: 17 officers, 237 men (ship); 6 officers, 30 men (landing craft)
- Armament: 1 × 5 in / 38 cal. DP gun; 16 × 20 mm single barrel AA guns; 4 × 2 pound pom pomAA guns;
- Notes: Characteristics are as of April 1944

HMS Oceanway (F143) was a Casa Grande-class dock landing ship of the Royal Navy provided under Lend-Lease from the US.

== History ==
The ship was authorised under the United States Lend-Lease act as BAPM-4 ("British Mechanized Artillery Transport 4"), but was reclassified as LSD-12 ("Landing Ship Dock 12") on 1 July 1942. The vessel was originally to have been named HMS Dagger, but the name HMS Oceanway was assigned to it in August 1943. The vessel was formally transferred to the United Kingdom on 29 March 1944.

Oceanway took part in the Normandy Landings, transporting 20 landing craft, arriving at Omaha Beach at 15:30 on 6 June 1944. After the landing the ship was of value transporting damaged landing craft for repair, in one case transporting 17 damaged LCM(3) craft to United Kingdom repair bases. The vessel served in the Far East in 1945 before being returned to the US.

It was loaned to Greece in Match 1947, where it served as Okeanos, before being returned to the United States in 1952. Later that year, it was loaned to France, where it served as Foudre (A646) and was eventually purchased by the French Government, serving in the French Navy until 1969. The ship was sunk as a target in 1970.
