= USS Fort Marion =

Casa Grande-class dock landing ship

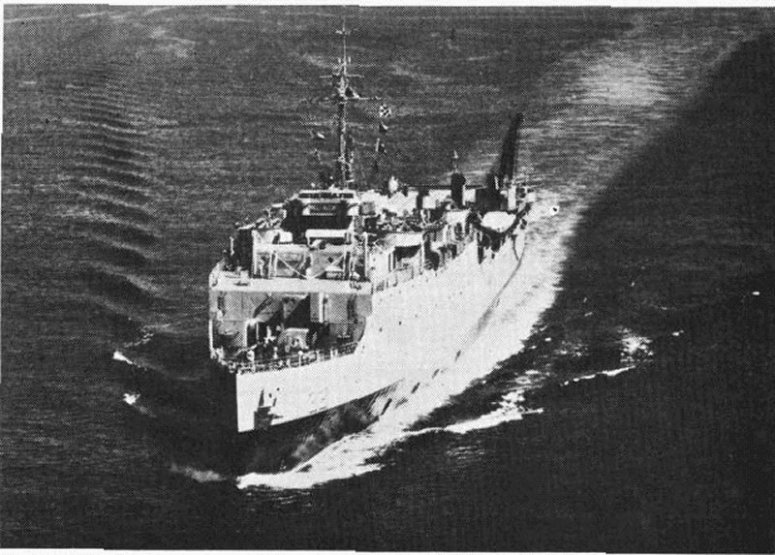
- USS Fort Marion (LSD-22) underway, date and place unknown. US Navy photo from "All Hands" magazine November 1958

History

United States
- Name: Fort Marion
- Namesake: Fort Marion in Florida
- Builder: Gulf Shipbuilding Corp.
- Launched: 22 May 1945
- Commissioned: 29 January 1946
- Decommissioned: 13 February 1970
- Stricken: 31 October 1974
- Fate: Sold to Taiwan, 15 April 1977

Taiwan
- Name: ROCS Chen Hai (LSD-192); "鎮海"
- Acquired: 15 April 1977
- Decommissioned: May 1999
- Fate: Sunk as artificial reef, 9 December 2000

General characteristics
- Class & type: Casa Grande-class dock landing ship
- Displacement: 7,930 tons (loaded), 4,032 tons (light draft)
- Length: 457 ft 9 in (139.5 m) overall
- Beam: 72 ft 2 in (22.0 m)
- Draft: 8 ft 2½ in (2.5 m) fwd, 10 ft ½ in (3.1 m) aft (light); 15 ft 5½ in (4.7 m) fwd, 16 ft 2 in (4.9 m) aft (loaded)
- Propulsion: 2 Babcock & Wilcox boilers, 2 Skinner Uniflow Reciprocating Steam Engines, 2 propeller shafts - each shaft 3,700 hp, at 240 rpm total shaft horse power 7,400, 2 11 ft 9 in diameter, 9 ft 9 in pitch propellers
- Speed: 17 knots (31 km/h)
- Range: 8,000 nmi. at 15 knots; (15,000 km at 28 km/h)
- Boats & landing craft carried: 3 × LCT (Mk V or VI); each w/ 5 medium tanks or; 2 × LCT (Mk III or IV); each w/ 12 medium tanks or; 14 × LCM (Mk III); each w/ 1 medium tank; or 1,500 long tons cargo or; 47 × DUKW or; 41 × LVT or; Any combination of landing vehicles and landing craft up to capacity
- Capacity: 22 officers, 218 men
- Complement: 17 officers, 237 men (ship); 6 officers, 30 men (landing craft)
- Armament: 1 × 5 in / 38 cal. DP gun; 2 × 40 mm quad AA guns; 2 × 40 mm twin AA guns; 16 × 20 mm AA guns
- Aircraft carried: modified in 1953 to accommodate helicopters on an added portable deck

USS Fort Marion (LSD-22) was a Casa Grande-class dock landing ship of the United States Navy. She was named for the Castillo de San Marcos in St. Augustine, Florida, which was named Fort Marion from 1821 till 1942.

== USS Fort Marion (LSD-22) ==
Fort Marion was launched on 22 May 1945 by Gulf Shipbuilding Corp., Chickasaw, Alabama, sponsored by Mrs. Louise S. Dodson; and commissioned on 29 January 1946.

Fort Marion arrived at San Diego her home port, 26 May 1946, and through the next three years repaired landing craft, carried cargo and landing craft between San Diego and San Francisco, and took part in amphibious training exercises on the California coast. Between 4 April and 21 July 1949, she made her first tour of duty in the Far East, calling in Alaska outward bound.

=== Korean War ===
Upon the outbreak of the Korean War, Fort Marion sailed for action 12 July 1950, and arrived at Pusan with Marines and their equipment 2 August. For the next month, she ferried troops from Kobe to Yokosuka for further routing onward to Korea. On 12 September, at Pusan, Fort Marion embarked men of the 3rd Battalion, 5th Marines and three LSUs, carrying ten tanks, for the invasion of Inchon. Fort Marion was the flagship of Captain Norman W. Sears' Advance Attack Group, which comprised Fort Marion and the fast transports Horace A. Bass, Diachenko, and Wantuck.

Shortly after midnight on the 15th, destroyers and cruisers of the Gunfire Support Group entered Flying Fish Channel and headed north, accompanied by the Advance Attack Group. Fort Marion's Marines and tanks landed on Green Beach on Wolmi-do starting at 06:33. The seizure of this strategically placed island made possible the landings at 17:30 that afternoon by the rest of the 5th Marines and the 1st Marines. Fort Marion lay off Inchon for the next month, receiving casualties and caring for small craft.

From 25 October 1950 until 23 November Fort Marion lay at Wonsan for similar duty, as well as aiding in the withdrawal early in December. From 29 December through March 1951, she carried troops from Japan to Korea.

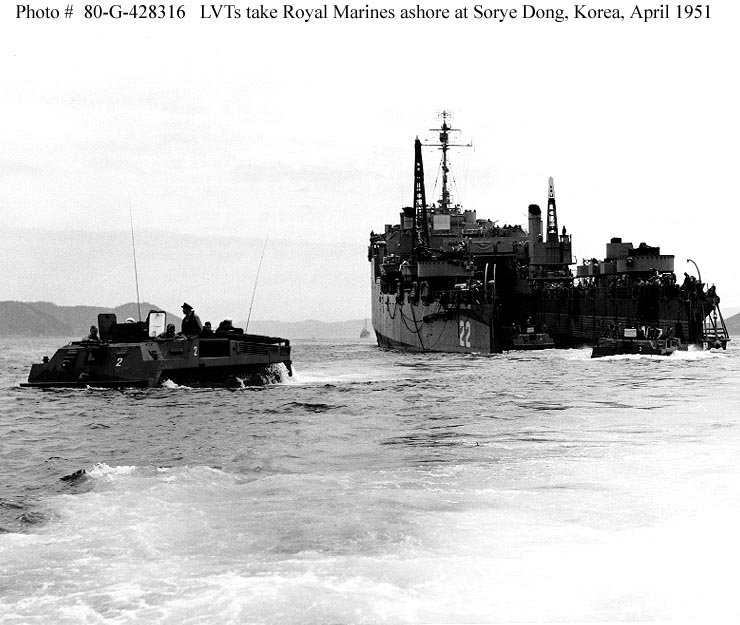
LVTs embarking British commandos leave Fort Marion for the beach at Sorye Dong, on 7 April 1951.

In April, a special task organization, Task Force 74, was set up under Admiral Roscoe H. Hillenkoetter, with the mission of interdicting North Korea's east coast rail line by a commando raid. Fort Marion, with 250 men of the British Royal Marines' 41 Commando battalion, and Begor (APD-127) with a UDT detachment, set sail for Sorye Dong, eight miles south of Sŏngjin, with a supporting force composed of Saint Paul (CA-73), two destroyers, and six minesweepers. The landing itself was the responsibility of Captain Philip W. Mothersill, commanding officer of Fort Marion and Commander Amphibious Group; Adm. Hillenkoetter controlled only the supporting ships. Despite fog and an unsuitable landing zone, the commandos blew up about 100 yards of railroad, and were then successfully reembarked, although they found that airstrikes by Task Force 77 had already made the railway inoperable. Fort Marion sailed from Yokosuka for home 26 April 1951.

During her second Korean War deployment, from 16 April 1952 to 14 January 1953, Fort Marion operated with a mine squadron in Wonsan Harbor, acting as mother ship for the small ships as they carried out their dangerous operations. She also operated with an amphibious construction battalion, and joined in a mock invasion on the coast north of Wonsan.

=== 1953 – 1960 ===
Extensively overhauled in 1953, Fort Marion was equipped with a mezzanine deck and fitted to carry helicopters. She arrived at Sasebo 7 December to resume duty as a minesweeper tender, and during this tour of duty joined in amphibious exercises off Okinawa and Japan. Back in San Diego 19 August 1954, she sailed later that year to the Hawaiian Islands for exercises, and in May 1955 took part in Operation Wigwam, the experimental detonation of an underwater atomic explosion.

In 1956–57, 1958, and 1959, Fort Marion made additional deployments to the western Pacific, taking part in mine and amphibious warfare operations, and in the summer of 1958, joining in emergency operations to meet the threat posed by renewed Communist shelling of the Nationalist-held offshore islands. In September, serving with the Taiwan Patrol Force, she brought supplies to Quemoy under Communist fire. Fort Marion spent much of 1960 in an extensive modernization overhaul which added many useful years to her expected span of service, and on 22 November sailed for Far Eastern duty once more.

Fort Marion served in several Vietnam War campaigns between 1965 and 1969.

Fort Marion was decommissioned on 13 February 1970, and stricken from the Naval Register on 31 October 1974. The ship was sold to the Republic of China on 15 April 1977.

=== Awards ===
Fort Marion received five battle stars for Korean War service and five campaign stars for Vietnam War service.

== ROCS Chen Hai (LSD-192) ==
Ex-Fort Marion served in the Republic of China Navy as ROCS Chen Hai (LSD-192; Chinese: 鎮海). She was decommissioned in May 1999, and sunk to form an artificial reef on 9 December 2000.
