= Defiance (ship) =

- Defiance (1795 ship) was launched in Hamburg in 1790, probably under another name. She started sailing out of London in 1795 as a slave ship in the triangular trade in enslaved people. She made three voyages as a slave ship between 1795 and 1800. She then left that trade but a French privateer captured her late in 1800.
- Defiance (1802 ship) was a French vessel that British owners purchased in 1802. She was lost in 1803 on a whaling voyage. She may have been the same vessel as the previous Defiance.

== See also ==
- HMS Defiance: the name of 12 ships and two shore establishments of the Royal Navy
- USS Defiance: the name of three US Navy ships
