= USS Fort Snelling =

The name USS Fort Snelling has been assigned to two dock landing ships of the United States Navy, in honor of Fort Snelling, a fort at the confluence of the Minnesota and Mississippi Rivers, for many years the northernmost military post in the land of the Sioux and Chippewa.

- The name Fort Snelling was assigned to LSD-23, a Casa Grande-class dock landing ship in 1944 but construction was canceled in 1945, due to the end of World War II. The unchristened hull was completed in 1956 as the roll-on/roll-off ship SS Carib Queen. In 1958 the Maritime Administration took over the vessel. She was assigned to MSTS in 1959, and renamed USNS Taurus (T-AK-273). Never commissioned, Taurus went out of service in 1968. Her name was struck from the Naval Vessel Register in 1971.
- USS Fort Snelling (LSD-30) was a Thomaston-class dock landing ship, which was launched in 1954. Her name was struck in 1992.
