= USS Hermitage (LSD-34) =

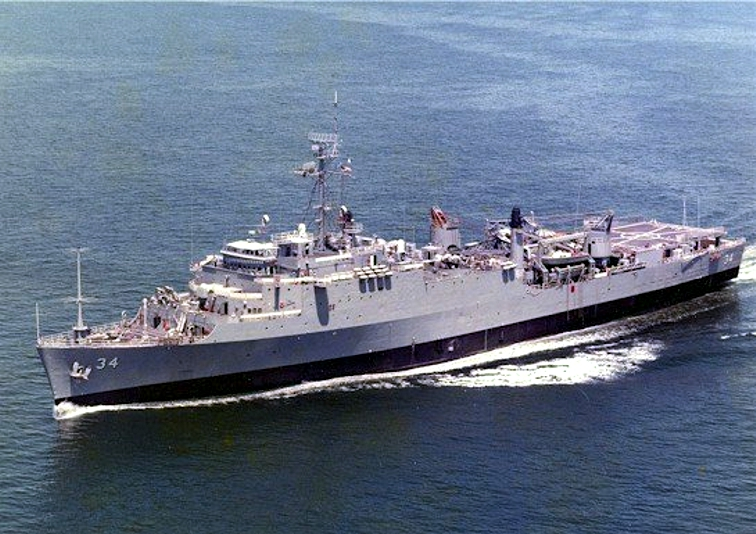
- USS Hermitage (LSD-34) underway, ca. the 1970s.

History

United States
- Name: USS Hermitage
- Namesake: The Hermitage
- Awarded: 14 October 1954
- Builder: Ingalls Shipbuilding
- Laid down: 11 April 1955
- Launched: 12 June 1956
- Commissioned: 14 December 1956
- Decommissioned: 2 October 1989
- Identification: LSD-34
- Fate: Transferred to Brazil 2 October 1989; Sold to Brazil 24 January 2001
- Stricken: 24 January 2001

Brazil
- Name: Ceará
- Namesake: State of Ceará
- Acquired: 2 October 1989
- Decommissioned: 29 April 2016
- Identification: MMSI number: 710461000; Callsign: PWFZ; Pennant number: G30
- Fate: Sunk as target 10 June 2021

General characteristics
- Class & type: Thomaston-class dock landing ship
- Displacement: 8,899 long tons (9,042 t) light; 11,525 long tons (11,710 t) full load
- Length: 510 ft (160 m)
- Beam: 84 ft (26 m)
- Draft: 19 ft (5.8 m)
- Propulsion: 2 × steam turbines, 2 shafts, 23,000 shp (17 MW)
- Speed: 21 knots (39 km/h; 24 mph)
- Boats & landing craft carried: 21 × LCM-6 landing craft in well deck
- Troops: 300
- Complement: 304
- Armament: 4 × twin 3"/50 caliber guns; 6 × twin 20 mm AA guns
- Aircraft carried: Up to 8 helicopters
- Aviation facilities: Helicopter landing area

USS Hermitage (LSD-34) was a Thomaston-class dock landing ship of the United States Navy in commission from 1956 to 1989. She was named for The Hermitage, President Andrew Jackson's estate just outside Nashville, Tennessee.

After her service in the U.S. Navy ended, she was in commission in the Brazilian Navy as Ceará (G30) from 1989 to 2016. She was the third Brazilian Navy ship named for Ceará, a state of Brazil. The Brazilian Navy sank her as a target in 2021.

== Construction and commissioning ==
Hermitage was laid down on 11 April 1955 by the Ingalls Shipbuilding Corporation at Pascagoula, Mississippi. She was launched on 12 June 1956, sponsored by Mrs. Alfred M. Pride, wife of Vice Admiral Alfred M. Pride, and commissioned on 14 December 1956.

== Service history ==
While on shakedown in the Caribbean, Hermitage was informally inspected by Admiral Arleigh Burke, then Chief of Naval Operations. After training operations out of Naval Station Norfolk, she sailed for the Mediterranean Sea in late August to join the 6th Fleet. Hermitage participated in exercises with NATO units and visited Sicily, Crete, Turkey, Italy, Greece, and Spain before returning to the States on 16 November 1957. Operations primarily with fast amphibious helicopter assault equipment and tactics occupied her until November 1959. With a cargo of Presidential helicopters embarked, Hermitage sailed to Karachi on 2 December via the Atlantic, Mediterranean, Suez Canal, and Red and Arabian seas to furnish transportation for President Dwight D. Eisenhower on his Asian and European tour. Mission successfully completed; she returned home via Barcelona on 17 January 1960.

Hermitage sailed on 28 November as flagship for Admiral A. L. Reed, COMSOLANT, for a good will cruise to South America and Africa. In the midst of this important cruise, Hermitage was diverted on 19 January 1961 to carry grain to the Democratic Republic of the Congo to help the United Nations combat starvation in that country. Relieved as flagship on 3 May by USS Spiegel Grove, Hermitage returned to Virginia on 16 May and soon resumed her pattern of operations and exercises off the Virginia Capes and in the Caribbean.

When the presence of Soviet nuclear missiles in Cuba threatened war in October 1962, Hermitage sailed to Guantanamo Bay to transport Marines to that threatened base and underline America's determination to maintain her position there. A second cruise to the Mediterranean from May to October 1963 took Hermitage to Naples, Athens, Genoa, Cannes, Sardinia, Malta, and Rota, Spain as well as other ports in the 6th Fleet's area.

After an assignment in February 1964 to the Caribbean Ready Squadron 12 based in Panama, early in May Hermitage undertook a logistics lift to Bermuda, and Sydney and Halifax, Nova Scotia, and in the fall took part until late November in the Navy-Marine Corps peacetime exercise "Operation Steel Pike I", visiting ports of Málaga and Gibraltar. In June 1965 she participated in a three-month deployment to the Caribbean area during the later stages of the Dominican Republic crisis, making practice amphibious landings at Vieques Island. After completion of overhaul in February 1966 followed by refresher training and amphibious training, Hermitage transported a marine battalion to the Caribbean in May. Through 1967 she continued in her assignment to the Atlantic Fleet.

== NDD Ceará (G-30) ==
Hermitage was decommissioned on 2 October 1989. She was transferred to the Brazilian Navy as Navio de Desembarque de Doca (Dock Landing Ship) NDD Ceará (G30) the same day. The ship was sold outright to Brazil and struck from the U.S. Naval Vessel Register on 24 January 2001. She was third Brazilian Navy ship to bear the name Ceará.

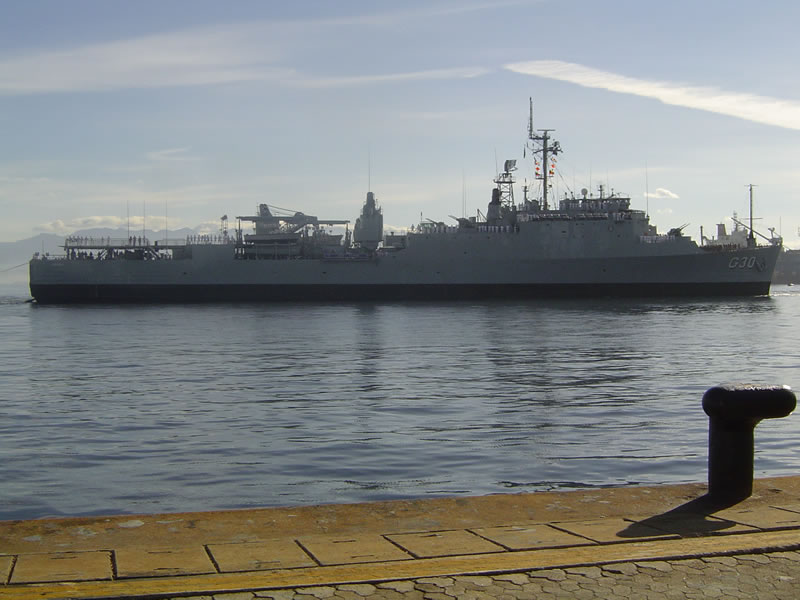
Ceará arrives at Rio de Janeiro after her first sealift voyage to Port-au-Prince.

During her Brazilian Navy service, Ceará undertook sealift missions to transport Brazilian Army and Brazilian Marine Corps vehicles and supplies between Port-au-Prince and Rio de Janeiro in support of Brazil's MINUSTAH contingent. In the Comissão Haiti XXI voyage in April 2015, the ship suffered "engine problems" that left her adrift off the coast of French Guiana, 500 nautical miles (926 km; 575 mi) from Belém. The ship eventually was towed to Belém for repairs and her original mission was completed by the navio de desembarque de carros de combate (tank landing ship) NDCC Almirante Saboia. While in port, a small fire erupted in one of the vessel's habitable compartments, causing no casualties and no significant damage. The ship left Belém on 1 August 2015, arriving in Rio de Janeiro by 27 August.

By March 2016, the Brazilian Navy decided to have the ship decommissioned by the 29th of April that year. In June 2021, the vessel was sunk as part of the live-fire exercise Operation Missilex 2021 off Rio de Janeiro and Cabo Frio, which involved the frigates Liberal and Independência firing their Mark 8s and testing the Brazilian-made Mansup anti-ship missile, as well as Mk. 82 bombs and strafing runs from A-4 Skyhawk fighters and a Mk. 48 torpedo launched from the submarine Tupi.
