= USS Plymouth Rock =

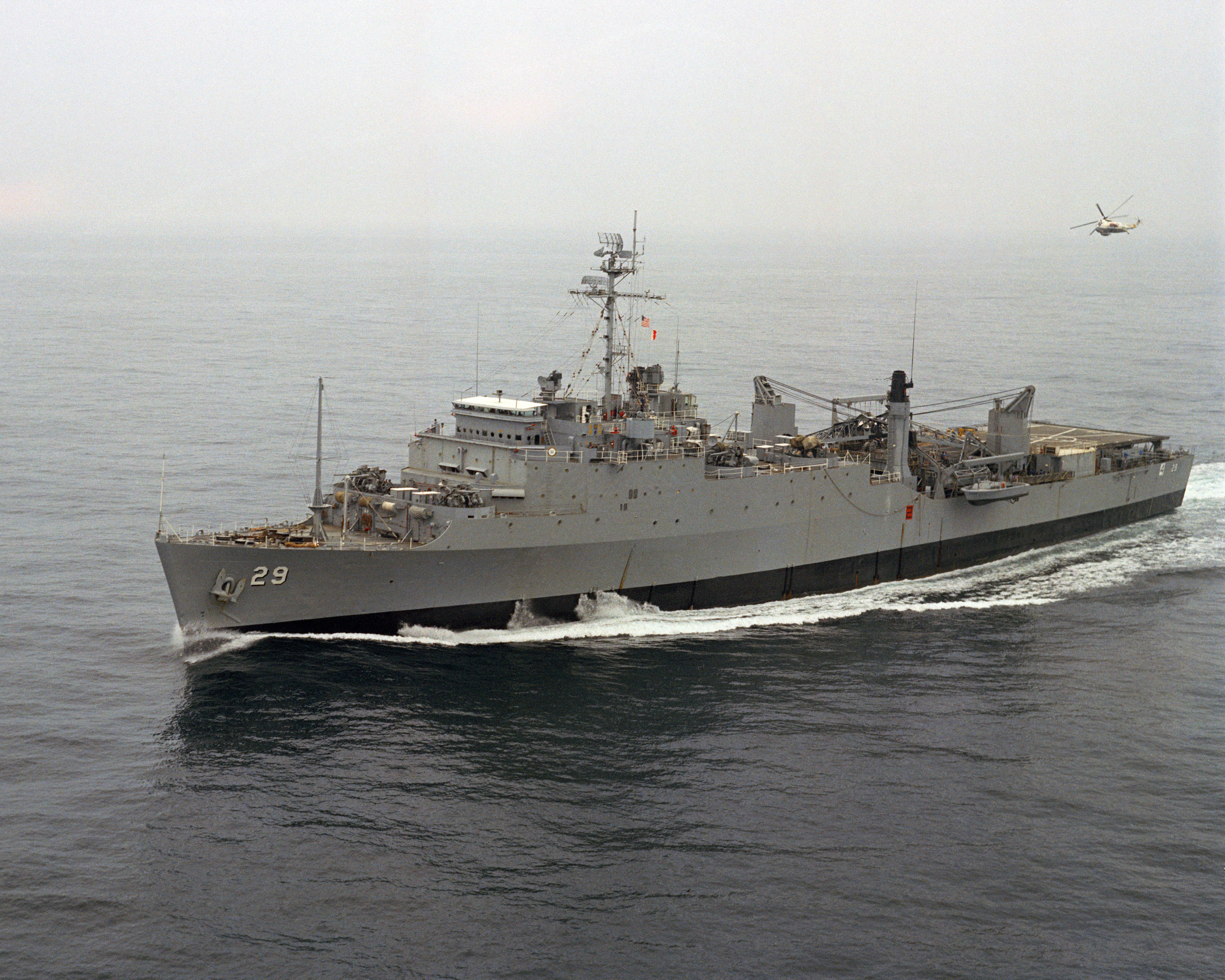
- Plymouth Rock underway, 10 September 1974

History

United States
- Name: USS Plymouth Rock
- Namesake: Plymouth Rock
- Awarded: 28 February 1952
- Builder: Ingalls Shipbuilding, Pascagoula, Mississippi
- Laid down: 4 May 1953
- Launched: 7 May 1954
- Commissioned: 29 November 1954
- Decommissioned: 30 September 1983
- Stricken: 24 February 1992
- Fate: Sold for scrap, 25 August 1995

General characteristics
- Class & type: Thomaston-class dock landing ship
- Displacement: 8,899 long tons (9,042 t) light; 11,525 long tons (11,710 t) full load
- Length: 510 ft (160 m)
- Beam: 84 ft (26 m)
- Draft: 19 ft (5.8 m)
- Propulsion: 2 × steam turbines, 2 shafts, 23,000 shp (17 MW)
- Speed: 21 knots (39 km/h; 24 mph)
- Boats & landing craft carried: 21 × LCM-6 landing craft in well deck
- Troops: 300
- Complement: 304
- Armament: 6 × twin 3"/50 caliber guns
- Aircraft carried: One helicopter
- Aviation facilities: Helicopter landing area usually of wood construction; no hangar

USS Plymouth Rock (LSD-29) was a Thomaston-class dock landing ship of the United States Navy, named for Plymouth Rock, the legendary landing site of the Pilgrims in 1620.

Plymouth Rock was laid down by Ingalls Shipbuilding Corp., Pascagoula, Mississippi on 4 May 1953; launched on 7 May 1954; sponsored by Mrs. Francis C. Denebrink; and commissioned on 29 November 1954.

== Service history ==
After sailing in January 1955 to Norfolk, her homeport, Plymouth Rock conducted shakedown off the East Coast and in the Caribbean. In the summer of 1955 she transported men and equipment to early warning sites in the far north. In March 1956 she deployed to the Mediterranean for amphibious operations, returning in October. During 1957 she made numerous trips to the Caribbean, and again resupplied the Arctic Distant Early Warning Line.

From May to October 1958 Plymouth Rock operated as a unit of the 6th Fleet in the Mediterranean, participating in the landing of U.S. Marines in Lebanon in July. After developing the concept of "vertical envelopment" by helicopter assault in early 1959, she made a Caribbean cruise to Puerto Rico and Cuba. In February 1960 she participated in "Operation Amigo", carrying support helicopters and other equipment for President Dwight Eisenhower's visit to South America. From March to December, she again deployed to the Mediterranean.

During 1961 Plymouth Rock made several cruises to the Caribbean and one to the Mediterranean, including work on Project Mercury and Project ASROC. During 1962 she made several deployments to the Caribbean, and was a member of the blockade force during the Cuban Missile Crisis. On 7 May 1963 she again deployed to the Mediterranean, returning in October.

In 1964 Plymouth Rock made two Caribbean cruises and then took part in Operation Steel Pike I off the coast of Spain, the largest amphibious operation since World War II. Early 1965 found Plymouth Rock on another Caribbean cruise. From 28 January to 7 March 1966 she was involved in H-Bomb recovery operations off Palomares, Spain following the Palomares hydrogen bombs incident. Late 1966 found her once again in the Caribbean, providing for the victims of Hurricane Inez in Haiti. After three Caribbean cruises in early 1967, Plymouth Rock deployed to northern Europe. She made two more Caribbean deployments in 1968. From June to July 1969 she again deployed to northern Europe.

Plymouth Rock was decommissioned on 30 September 1983 and transferred to the Maritime Administration on 8 November 1989 and laid up in the National Defense Reserve Fleet. Her name was struck from the Navy List on 24 February 1992 and she was sold for scrapping, 25 August 1995, to Peck Recycling, Richmond, Virginia, for $268,707.
