= Defiance =

Defiance may refer to:

== Film, television and theatre ==
- Defiance (1952 film), a Swedish drama film directed by Gustaf Molander
- Defiance (1980 film), an American crime drama starring Jan-Michael Vincent
- Defiance (2002 film), a western starring Brandon Bollig
- Defiance (2008 film), an American World War II film starring Daniel Craig and Liev Schreiber
- Defiance (play), a 2005 play by John Patrick Shanley
- Defiance (TV series), a science fiction TV series
- "Defiance" (L.A.'s Finest), a 2019 television episode
- HMAS Defiance, a fictional Australian warship in the TV series Patrol Boat

== Games ==
- Defiance (video game), a 2013 tie-in with the TV series Defiance
- Defiance (1997 video game), a first-person shooter for Windows
- Defiance, an expansion campaign for the computer game Independence War
- Legacy of Kain: Defiance, a 2003 video game

== Literature ==
- Defiance (book), a 1951 memoir by Savitri Devi
- Defiance (novel), a 2007 novel by Don Brown
- Defiance, a novel by Kenneth Bulmer
- Defiance: The Bielski Partisans, a book by Nechama Tec; basis for the 2008 film (see above)

== Music ==
- Defiance (metal band), an American thrash metal band
- Defiance (punk band), an American street punk band
- Defiance (EP), a 1994 EP by the punk band
- Defiance (Assemblage 23 album), 2002
- Defiance (Deströyer 666 album), 2009
- Defiance (Lahannya album), 2009
- Defiance, an album by Jack Starr's Burning Starr, 2009
- Defiance, an EP by Rome, 2022
- Defiance Records, a German record label

== Maritime ==
- HMS Defiance, nineteen ships of the British Royal Navy
- USS Defiance, three ships of the U.S. Navy
- Defiance (schooner), an American wooden two-masted schooner (1848–1854)
- Defiance (steamboat), a vessel in the Puget Sound Mosquito Fleet in the early 1900s
- Defiance (yacht), a participant in the 1914 America's Cup
- SS Empire Defiance, a ship in the Empire series in the service of the British Government
- CSS Defiance, a ship in the Confederate River Defense Fleet during the American Civil War

== Places in the United States ==
- Defiance, Iowa
- Defiance, Kentucky
- Defiance, Missouri (St. Charles county)
- Defiance, Missouri (Worth county) a 19th-century town
- Defiance, Ohio
  - Defiance College
  - Defiance High School (Ohio)
  - Defiance Regional Medical Center
- Defiance County, Ohio
- Defiance Township, Ohio
- Defiance, Pennsylvania
- Mount Defiance (New York), a hill in New York

== Other uses ==
- Defiance Campaign, a 1951 anti-apartheid initiative by the African National Congress
- Defiance railway station, or Defiance Platform, a disused station on the Plymouth to Penzance Line in the UK
- Defiance Technologies, part of the Hinduja Group, a provider of IT, ERP and engineering services
- Camp Defiance, a Union camp in Kansas during the American Civil War
- Defiance Cycle Company, a cycle manufacturer formed in Wales in 1880
- Defiance Wrestling Federation, a defunct pro wrestling promotion from 2009 to 2010
- DEFIANCE Wrestling, a similarly named and currently active pro wrestling promotion
- Tacoma Defiance, the MLS Next Pro reserve team for Seattle Sounders FC
- Project Defiance, A short-lived superhero team led by Deathstroke in DC Comics

== See also ==
- Fort Defiance (disambiguation)
- Point Defiance (disambiguation)
- Defiant (disambiguation)
- Defy (disambiguation)
