= USS Thomaston =

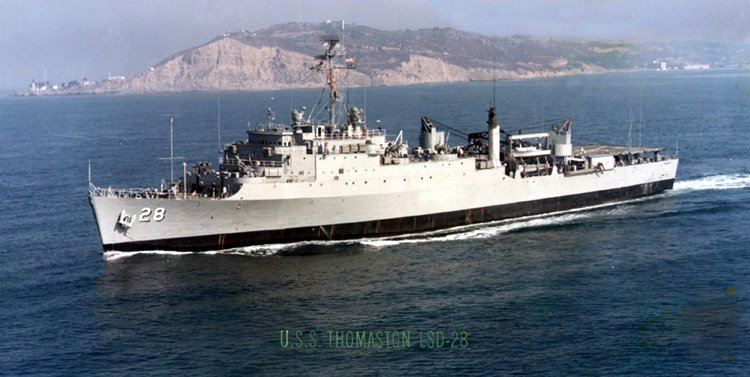
- USS Thomaston (LSD-28)

History

United States
- Name: USS Thomaston
- Namesake: Thomaston, Maine
- Awarded: 28 February 1952
- Builder: Ingalls Shipbuilding, Pascagoula, Mississippi
- Laid down: 3 March 1953
- Launched: 9 February 1954
- Commissioned: 17 September 1954
- Decommissioned: 28 September 1984
- Stricken: 24 February 1992
- Motto: Suaviter in Modo, Fortier in Re; ("Gentle in Manner, Strong in Deeds")
- Fate: Sold for Scrapping 28 July 2011 to All Star Metals, Brownsville, Tx

General characteristics
- Class & type: Thomaston-class dock landing ship
- Displacement: 8,899 long tons (9,042 t) light; 11,525 long tons (11,710 t) full load
- Length: 510 ft (160 m)
- Beam: 84 ft (26 m)
- Draft: 19 ft (5.8 m)
- Propulsion: 2 × steam turbines, 2 shafts, 23,000 shp (17 MW)
- Speed: 21 knots (39 km/h; 24 mph)
- Boats & landing craft carried: 21 × LCM-6 landing craft in well deck
- Troops: 300
- Complement: 304
- Armament: 8 × twin 3 in (76 mm)/50 cal guns when launched; 6 × twin 20 mm AA guns were planned but never installed
- Aircraft carried: One helicopter
- Aviation facilities: Helicopter landing area usually of wood construction; no hangar

USS Thomaston (LSD-28) was the lead ship of her class of dock landing ship of the United States Navy. She was named for Thomaston, Maine, the home of General Henry Knox, the first Secretary of War to serve under the United States Constitution.

Thomaston (LSD-28) was laid down on 3 March 1953 at Pascagoula, Mississippi, by the Ingalls Shipbuilding Corp.; launched on 9 February 1954, sponsored by Mrs. Mathias B. Gardner; and commissioned on 17 September 1954.

== 1955–1964 ==
Following shakedown in the Caribbean, Thomaston transited the Panama Canal and joined the Pacific Fleet Amphibious Force. From July through October 1955, Thomaston participated in the Arctic Resupply Project, provisioning stations on the Distant Early Warning Line before taking part in cold-weather landing exercises in the Aleutians in November 1955 and again in January and February 1956.

The landing ship's duties soon took her southward to the warmer climes of the Hawaiian Islands, where she conducted local operations and exercises in March and April. On hand in Santa Barbara, California, from 2 July to 9 July, for the Semana Nautica Celebration, Thomaston returned to the Hawaiian Islands and participated in three landing exercises in the autumn before returning to the west coast to conduct exercises off the Marine Corps base at Camp Pendleton, California, during the spring of 1957.

She subsequently deployed to the Western Pacific (WestPac) in 1959 and participated in exercises off Borneo and Korea in June and August of that year. Alternating between the west coast and WestPac, Thomaston participated in a busy schedule of operations and cruises into the 1960s. During the international tensions brought on by the United States' discovery of Russian missile sites in Cuba, Thomaston sailed via the Panama Canal to the Caribbean and operated with the Atlantic Fleet until tensions abated with the withdrawal of the missiles. She then returned to San Diego on 15 December 1962.

She commenced the year 1963 at her home port, NS San Diego, and conducted training exercises into February before serving as primary control ship off "Green" Beach, Del Mar, California, during Operation Steel Gate from 28 February to 8 March 1963. Thomaston departed the west coast on 26 March, bound for the Far East, and arrived via Pearl Harbor at Subic Bay on 20 April. Serving with the Amphibious Force of the 7th Fleet; she participated in special operations in the South China Sea from 22 April to 5 May. A second special operation in the South China Sea — again with the Amphibious Ready Group, 7th Fleet — took place in late August and early September.

After operating in Okinawan waters, Thomaston departed Yokosuka, Japan, on 4 November, bound for the west coast of the United States. While en route three days later, the LSD received word of a merchantman in distress. Changing course, Thomaston found SS Barbara Fritchie in heavy seas, dead in the water, having lost a propeller and suffering rudder damage. Thomaston took her in tow and headed for Pearl Harbor, transferring the tow to USS Cree on 12 November. The LSD's stop at Pearl Harbor was a brief one, though, as she arrived and departed for home on the same day, 15 November, making port at San Diego on 21 November 1963

== Vietnam War ==
=== 1964-1965 ===
Thomaston operated locally and trained through the early fall of 1964, when she sailed for the Philippines on 26 October to commence another WestPac deployment. Arriving at Subic Bay on 16 November, the LSD conducted special operations in the South China Sea, including a dredge lift from Saigon to Da Nang, South Vietnam, between 21 November and 16 December. Christmas of that year found Thomaston again at sea, on "special operations" in the South China Sea. She was present at the initial Marine landings at Da Nang and Chu Lai, South Vietnam. She remained deployed to WestPac until June 1965, when she returned to San Diego to conduct routine local operations off the west coast.

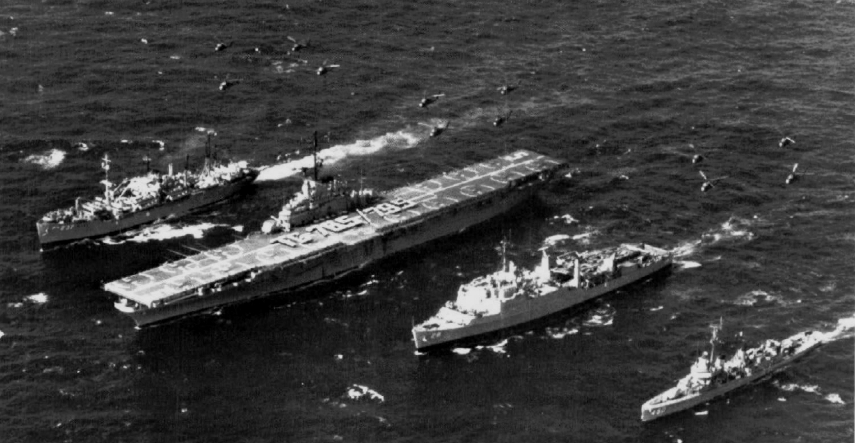

=== 1966 ===
Departing San Diego on 10 January 1966 for WestPac, Thomaston arrived in Vietnamese coastal waters on 5 February and immediately commenced operations at Chu Lai and Da Nang, serving as boat haven at the latter port. She returned to the United States in the spring and remained at San Diego from 9 April to 9 July 1966. The ship then headed back to the western Pacific and operated out of Subic Bay from 28 July through the end of the deployment. She participated in Operations Deckhouse III (phases one and two) and Deckhouse IV in August and September. In the former, Thomaston landed marines north of Vũng Tàu and served as primary control ship and boat haven during the subsequent operations. She then landed marines at a point just south of the Vietnamese Demilitarized Zone (DMZ) between North and South Vietnam. She thus continued in her familiar role as primary control ship and boat haven during "Deckhouse IV" and staged boat convoys carrying supplies 9 miles (14 km) up the Cua Viet River to Đông Hà.

Returning to Subic Bay, Thomaston later participated in Exercise Mudpuppy II which was designed to provide training in river operations for marines. Held on Mindoro in the Philippines, "Mudpuppy II" ended three days before Christmas; and Thomaston sailed for Vietnam.

=== 1967 ===
She thus began the year 1967 as she had begun the previous year, in active combat operations against Viet Cong and People's Army of Vietnam units along the coastline. Participating in Deckhouse V and Deckhouse VI into March, Thomaston's participation in the former operation began on 5 January 1967 when she dropped anchor off the mouth of the Cổ Chiên River. She helped to launch the thrust of "Deckhouse V", aimed at the delta lowlands of Kiến Hòa Province, South Vietnam. The combined American and Vietnamese Marine Corps landings successfully challenged Viet Cong forces in this area. Relieved at Vũng Tàu by USS Point Defiance on 6 March, Thomaston sailed for repairs at Subic Bay, en route home via Hong Kong, Okinawa, Yokosuka, and Pearl Harbor.

=== 1968 ===
Following an extensive overhaul at San Diego from 28 June to 18 December 1967, Thomaston departed her home port on 21 February 1968 for her regular deployment to WestPac. After joining the Amphibious Ready Group off Vietnam in the I Corps zone, Thomaston commenced operations in support of marines of the Special Landing Forces (SLF) engaged ashore in the defense of Quảng Trị Province. She spent the month of March steaming in coastwise logistics runs between Da Nang, Cam Ranh Bay and the burgeoning Army supply base at Wunder Beach.

During her operations at the latter port, Thomaston demonstrated to the Army the versatility of the Landing Ship Dock by serving as an effective repair ship with a built-in drydock. Many small craft and pontoon piers serving the supply base received hull and machinery work by the crew in the ship's capacious well deck. During this deployment, Thomaston proved that the amphibious ship was a natural vehicle for inter-service cooperation.

While operating off the coast of South Vietnam with the Amphibious Ready Group, Thomaston conducted two search and rescue operations. On the evening of 25 May, a CH-46 helicopter, loaded with mail, passengers, and baggage, lost power in the vicinity of USS Valley Forge and crashed. The helicopter remained afloat while those on board jettisoned all excess weight. It gradually sank, but fortunately not before all men had safely left the craft. Within a mile of the accident Thomaston dispatched two boats to the scene and recovered not only four of the passengers and crew of the CH-46 (the remainder were picked up by helicopter) but the crew from one of Valley Forge's boats which had capsized upon launching. Later, on 2 June and again while in the vicinity of Valley Forge, Thomaston picked up men from the carrier who had jumped overboard to escape flames from a flight deck fire.

Thomaston next participated in Badger Catch III, the withdrawal of the Special Landing Force from the Cua Viet River area bordering on the extreme southern edge of the DMZ. Subsequently, Thomaston and her embarked SLF participated in a swift succession of operations against Communist ground forces. Operation Swift Sabre plunged into Viet Cong-contested areas of the western shore of Da Nang harbor on 8 June 1968. Following Exercise Hilltop XX in Subic Bay, Thomaston participated in Eager Yankee which landed elements of the SLF in Quảng Trị Province near Cua Tu Hien on 9 July before engaging, 13 days later, in Swift Play in the coastal area south of Da Nang. These operations resulted in the capture of significant numbers of weapons and stores and the destruction of operating bases and installations from which the enemy had launched attacks against other "friendly forces". During "Swift Play", Thomaston came under shore battery fire for a brief time.

=== 1969–1974 ===
For the next five years, Thomaston actively supported the war effort in Vietnam, conducted troop and cargo lifts, and participated in amphibious operations. The tide of war, however, was running against the South Vietnamese; and, by the spring of 1975, concentrated efforts on the part of North Vietnamese and Viet Cong troops put pressure on the crumbling South Vietnamese government.

=== 1975 ===
The end for South Vietnam came during Thomaston's 15th WestPac deployment. The beginning of the year 1975 found the landing ship at Subic Bay, undergoing a needed availability. She departed Subic Bay on 2 February, bound for Singapore where she stayed until 13 February. As a member of Task Group (TG) 76.4 Thomaston later returned to port at Subic Bay on 25 February. Her anticipated upkeep period, however, was cut short when the ship was directed to return to sea with TG 76.4. On 2 March, Thomaston departed Subic Bay to execute Operation Eagle Pull which evacuated Americans and designated Cambodian citizens from the capital city of Phnom Penh. The civilians were to be picked up by helicopters and ferried to the ships offshore.

She remained in readiness until the evening of 5 April, when Thomaston was ordered to Phú Quốc island to assist Vietnamese nationals evacuated from Da Nang. She transferred food and medical supplies via her LCUs and LCM-8 assault craft to Vietnamese refugees quartered on Military Sealift Command (MSC) vessels.

TG 76.4 executed "Eagle Pull" on 12 April, and Thomaston took part as a plane guard on station to the south. Upon the successful completion of the operation, designated units of the group proceeded to Sattahip, Thailand, to debark civilians airlifted from Cambodia. Meanwhile, Thomaston sailed for the Philippines, arriving at Subic Bay on the morning of 17 April, but her much deserved in-port period was again abbreviated by operational necessity. Underway once more at 23:30 on 18 April, Thomaston sailed for Vietnamese waters to take part in the evacuation of the besieged capital, Saigon.

On 29 April, Operation Frequent Wind commenced at 15:00. During the next nine hours Thomaston received 811 Vietnamese, American, and other refugees. During this operation — for which the ship received the Meritorious Unit Commendation — Thomaston received evacuees via helicopter, landing helicopters as large as CH-46's on her flight deck aft. All Vietnamese citizens were to be processed and placed aboard MSC ships.

American citizens would be retained on board for transportation to the Philippines. Although limited by space, all individuals were provided with food, clothing, and medical attention. Makeshift shelters, "tents" made from marines' blankets, were set up on board.

Returning to Subic Bay on 3 May, Thomaston immediately commenced preparations for her homeward voyage. Civilians embarked during Frequent Wind were debarked at Subic Bay. The ship then headed on for the west coast of the United States, via Buckner Bay, Okinawa; and Pearl Harbor; and arrived at San Diego on 6 June 1975.

== 1975–1998 ==
Thomaston subsequently operated with the Pacific Fleet in 1976, conducting training and local operations in waters off Okinawa, Japan, Korea, and Hawaii, before returning to San Diego at the close of the year.

Following a material inspection by the Navy Board of Inspection and Survey in January 1977, Thomaston commenced preparations for her forthcoming overhaul. On 1 June, she entered Todd Shipyard, Seattle, for the most extensive overhaul conducted on an amphibious ship to that time. Lasting 18 months and costing nearly $30 million, the overhaul was completed on 7 December 1978. Thomaston returned to her home port of San Diego on 14 December.

In February 1980 Thomaston and her crew received the Humanitarian Service Medal for her part in the radioactive cleanup operations on Eniwetok Atoll in the Pacific.

During USS Thomaston's 1981 Westpac as part of Amphibious Squadron Five, the ship and crew would receive a second Humanitarian Service Medal for the rescue of 77 Vietnamese refugees in the South China Sea in April 1981. During this cruise she would make her only visit to Perth/Fremantle, Australia, from 28 May to 2 June 1981.

USS Thomaston began her final deployment on 17 January 1984, making port calls at Manila, PI, Hong Kong, Pusan (Busan), South Korea and Pearl Harbor HI, all the while conducting exercises with three major exercises along with exercises with South Korean and Philippines naval units. USS Thomaston returned home to San Diego CA on 27 July 1984, completing 30 years of service.

USS Thomaston was decommissioned 28 September 1984 and her name struck from the Naval Vessel Register 2 February 1992, and laid up in the National Defense Reserve Fleet, under temporary custody of the Maritime Administration (MARAD). The vessel was sold 29 September 1995 by MARAD to Pegasus Inc., but repossessed by the Navy, 1 July 1997. Permanent custody was reassigned to MARAD, 18 November 1998 for lay up in the National Defense Reserve Fleet, Suisun Bay, Benicia, California. On 28 July 2011, Thomaston was sold by MARAD to All Star Metals of Brownsville, Tx for $894,708 to be dismantled. Thomaston departed the Suisun Bay Reserve Fleet on 18 August 2011 to be cleaned by Allied Defense Recycling at the former Mare Island Naval Shipyard. Thomaston was towed to Brownsville upon completion of the cleaning and has been scrapped.

Thomaston received 11 battle stars, and the following:

AFEM Armed Forces Expeditionary Medal

ASM Antarctica Service Medal

CAR Combat Action Ribbon

HSM Humanitarian Service Medal

JMUA Joint Meritorious Unit Award

MUC Meritorious Unit Commendation (two for Vietnam war service)

NAVE Navy "E" Ribbon

NEM Navy Expeditionary Medal

NUC Navy Unit Commendation (one)

PUC Presidential Unit Citation

PRPUCB Republic of Philippine Presidential Unit Citation

RVNCA Republic of Vietnam Meritorious Unit Citation (Civil Actions Medal, First Class Color w/Palm)

RVNGC RVNGC - Republic of Vietnam Meritorious Unit Citation (Gallantry Cross medal Color with Palm)

VNSM Vietnam Service Medal

SLOC Secretary of the Navy Letter of Commendation
