= USS Spiegel Grove =

US Navy ship sunk off Key Largo as an artificial reef

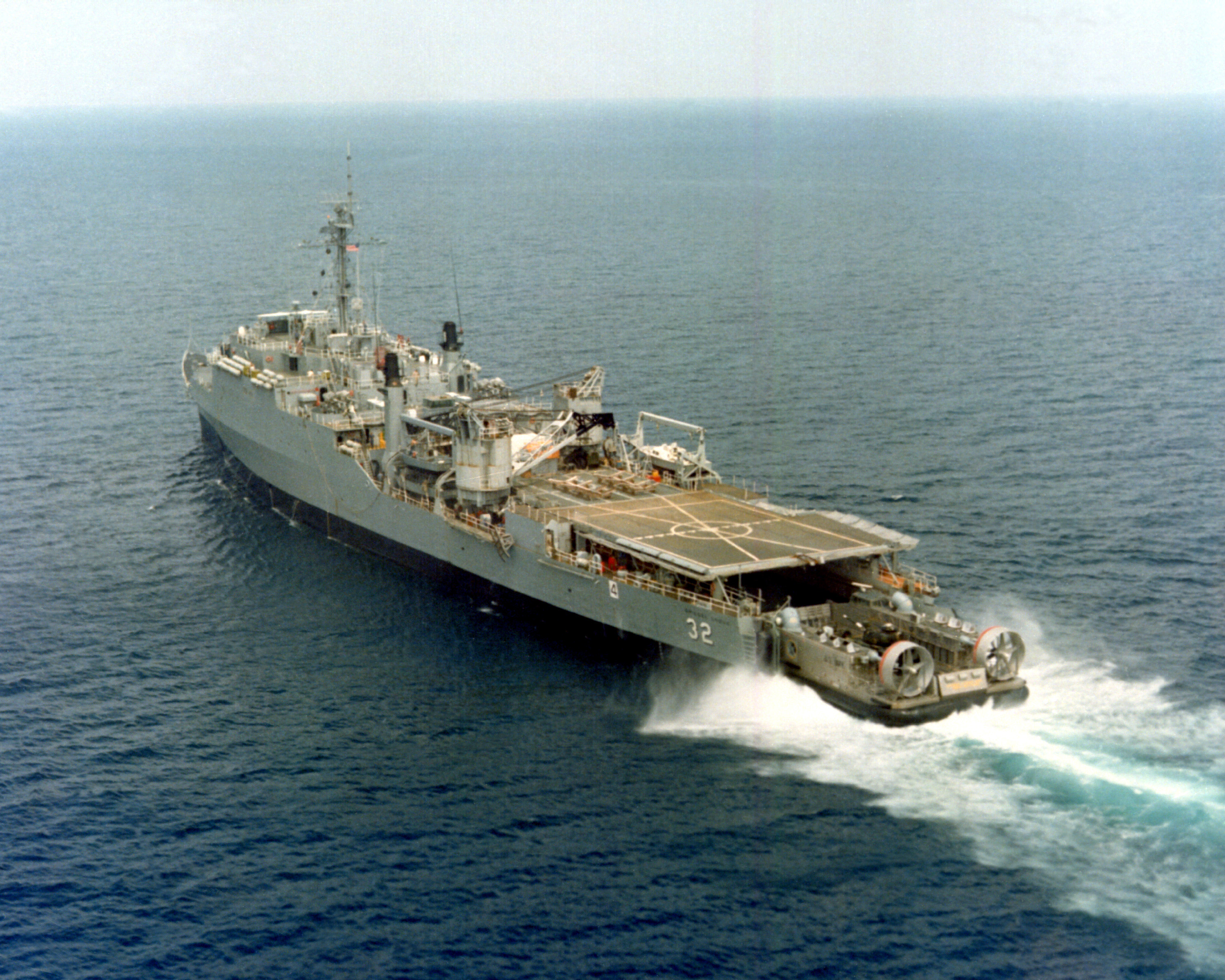
- USS Spiegel Grove (LSD-32) with a LCAC returning into the docking well of the ship

History

United States
- Name: Spiegel Grove
- Namesake: Spiegel Grove
- Awarded: 18 March 1954
- Builder: Ingalls Shipbuilding, Pascagoula, Mississippi
- Laid down: 7 September 1954
- Launched: 10 November 1955
- Commissioned: 8 June 1956
- Decommissioned: 2 October 1989
- Stricken: 13 December 1989
- Nickname(s): "Top Dog"
- Fate: Sunk as an artificial reef, 17 May 2002

General characteristics
- Class & type: Thomaston-class dock landing ship
- Displacement: 8,899 long tons (9,042 t) light; 11,525 long tons (11,710 t) full load
- Length: 510 ft (160 m)
- Beam: 84 ft (26 m)
- Draft: 19 ft (5.8 m)
- Propulsion: 2 steam turbines, 2 shafts, 23,000 shp (17 MW)
- Speed: 21 knots (39 km/h)
- Boats & landing craft carried: 21 × LCM-6s; Unknown number of LCACs
- Troops: 330 enlisted troops
- Complement: 18 officers, 300 crew
- Armament: 8 × 3 in (76mm) DP guns (4×2); 12 × 20 mm AA guns (6×2)
- Aircraft carried: up to 8 helicopters

USS Spiegel Grove (LSD-32) was a Thomaston-class dock landing ship of the United States Navy. She was named for Spiegel Grove, the home and estate in Fremont, Ohio, of Rutherford B. Hayes, the 19th President of the United States.

== Career ==
Spiegel Grove was laid down on 7 September 1954, by the Ingalls Shipbuilding Corp., Pascagoula, Mississippi, launched on 10 November 1955. She was sponsored by Mrs. Webb C. Hayes and commissioned on 8 June 1956.

Spiegel Grove sailed for Hampton Roads and arrived at Norfolk, Virginia, on 7 July 1956. She headed for the Guantanamo Bay area on her shakedown cruise on 26 July 1956 and returned on 15 September. The ship was in the yard during October 1956, participating in amphibious exercises the following month off Onslow Beach, North Carolina.

On 9 January 1957, Spiegel Grove, with other ships of Transport Amphibious Squadron 4 (TransPhibRon 4), sailed from Morehead City, North Carolina, with elements of the 6th Marines for a tour with the 6th Fleet in the Mediterranean. She returned to Norfolk on 3 June and operated along the east coast for the remainder of the year. In November, she transported 364 Army troops to Labrador. In January 1958, the LSD (dock landing ship) was deployed with her squadron to the 6th Fleet on an extended tour which did not end until 6 October. On 22 October, Spiegel Grove was assigned to PhibRon 10, the new Fast Squadron. The years 1959 and 1960 saw the LSD participating in numerous operations along the east coast and in the Caribbean.

Spiegel Grove stood out of Norfolk in April 1961 with Task Force 88 (TF 88) for "Solant Amity II," a good will tour to the African coast. The force carried tons of medical supplies, food, disaster supplies, toys, books, and seed. During the four-month cruise, the ships visited Gambia, Durban, the Malagasy Republic, the Seychelles Islands, Zanzibar, Kenya, the Union of South Africa, Togo, and Gabon before returning home on 8 September. She then entered Horne Brothers Shipyard, Newport News, Virginia, for an overhaul that was not completed until early January 1962.

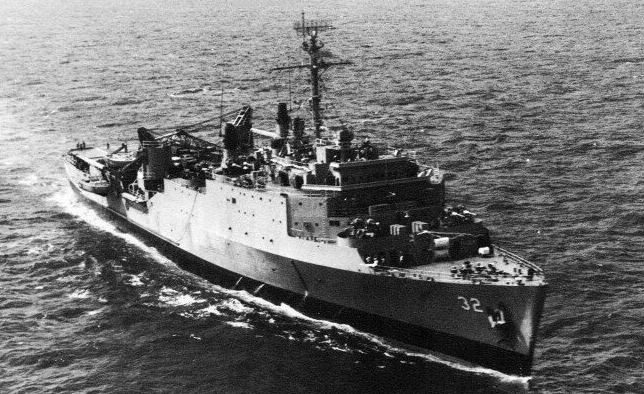
USS Spiegel Grove in 1965

Spiegel Grove conducted refresher training and then spent March and April in amphibious exercises in the Caribbean. In May, she took part in operations supporting Malcolm Scott Carpenter's crewed space flight in Mercury-Atlas 7. In July and August, she returned to the Caribbean for "Phibulex 2-62." On 1 December 1962, a tender availability period was begun to prepare the ship for "Solant Amity IV". The LSD loaded supplies during January 1963 and sailed, on 15 February for her second good-will tour which lasted until late May. The ship steamed over 21,000 nautical miles (39,000 km) and visited nine countries before returning home. Spiegel Grove next deployed to the Caribbean from July to September with PhibRon 8.

The landing ship spent the greater part of her active service participating in amphibious exercises along the eastern seaboard and in the Caribbean. She was deployed to the 6th Fleet from January to June 1964; 3 November 1966 to 11 May 1967; and from 17 April to 9 October 1971. She participated in "Operation Steel Pike I" off Spain in October 1964 and made a midshipman cruise to England and Denmark in 1970. On 22 July 1974, she participated in the evacuation of American citizens from Cyprus along with several other ships of the U.S. Sixth Fleet. She repeated this service in 1976, this time in Lebanon, during "Operation Fluid Drive."

In 1983, she won the Marjorie Sterrett Battleship Fund Award for the Atlantic Fleet.

The 24th Marine Expeditionary Unit participated in Eastern Wind in August 1987 in the area of Gee Salay, Somalia. At sea, Spiegel Grove, USS Saginaw, and USS La Moure County functioned as the Amphibious Squadron 32/Commander Task Unit 76.8.2 from 2–9 August 1987.

== Post-commission career ==
Spiegel Grove was decommissioned 2 October 1989 and her name struck from the Navy list on 13 December 1989. The vessel was transferred to the United States Maritime Administration in the James River "mothball" fleet.

In 1998, title passed to the state of Florida, with the plan of sinking the hull to make an artificial reef off Key Largo. To achieve this, the EPA had to increase the acceptable amount of PCB (a toxic chemical substance) remaining in future wrecks from 2 ppm to 50 ppm. On 13 June 2001, Spiegel Grove was transferred to the State of Florida Fish & Wildlife Conservation Commission, Key Largo, Fla., by the Maritime Administration, so that the ship could be sunk as an artificial reef and tourist attraction for divers.

== Sinking for reef ==
Wreck of USS Spiegel Grove
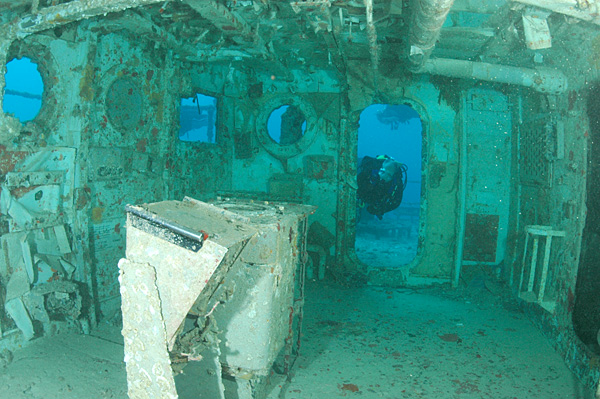
- Diver looking inside the maneuvering bridge

- Location within Florida Location within the United States
- Location: Florida, United States
- Waterbody: Florida Keys National Marine Sanctuary
- Nearest land: Key Largo
- Coordinates: 25°04′00.2″N 80°18′00.7″W
- Dive type: Open-water, Wreck
- Depth range: 70 to 130 ft (21 to 40 m)
- Entry type: Boat
- Bottom composition: Metal, silt

Red tape and financial problems delayed the sinking of USS Spiegel Grove for several years, but the ship was finally moved from Virginia to Florida in May 2002. The total preparation and reefing cost was $1 million. The ship sank prematurely on 17 May 2002. During the planned sinking, volunteer work crews dropped her 12-ton anchors and flooded her ballast tanks with water. But the ex-Spiegel Grove settled too soon and suddenly started rolling to her starboard side, forcing workers to abandon ship – and their equipment. She sank several hours ahead of schedule, ending up upside-down on the sea bottom and leaving her bow protruding slightly out of the ocean and her stern resting on the ocean floor.

On 10–11 June 2002, at an additional cost of $250,000, the ship was rolled onto her starboard side by Resolve Marine Group, which pumped air into the port side hull tanks to displace at least 2,000 tons of water. Air bags with 350–400 tons of buoyancy and the assistance of two tugboats were also necessary. On 26 June 2002 the wreck was finally opened to recreational divers. In the next week, over a thousand divers visited the site. There were 50,000 dives annually to the ship during just its first two years.

The ex-Spiegel Grove is located on Dixie Shoal, 6 miles (10 km) off the Florida Keys in the Florida Keys National Marine Sanctuary. For a scuba diver, it is 510 feet (160 m) long and 84 feet (26 m) wide; it is said that one can dive this wreck 100 times and still never see it in its entirety. Her top deck is about 60 feet (18 m) below the water's surface. The vessel's hull, which is a labyrinth inside, is as much as 135 feet (41 m) under water, and silt can get kicked up and reduce visibility inside to almost zero, which can cause disorientation. The depth of the wreck requires that divers have an advanced certification.

In July 2005, Hurricane Dennis shifted the Spiegel Grove onto her keel, right-side-up, which was the position originally intended when she was sunk.

=== Deaths ===
Since being opened to the public, multiple lives have been lost on or in conjunction with dives to the wreck.

- In April 2003, Eunice Lasala, 48, of Fredericksburg, Virginia, died from a medical condition after surfacing.
- On 20 April 2005, Tarik Khair-el-din, 44 of Indialantic, Florida, made it to the surface after running out of air but drowned.
- In February 2006, David Hargis, 48, of Kansas City, Missouri, died from a medical problem after making it back to the surface in distress.
- On 16 March 2007, three divers (Kevin Coughlin, 51; Jonathan Walsweer, 38; and Scott Stanley, 55 – all from New Jersey) died while attempting a penetration dive to the interior of the ship.
- On 17 October 2013, Captain Joseph Dragojevich, 43, of Lake County Emergency Medical Services, Florida, went missing in a penetration dive deep inside the wreck and was found the following day by rescue teams.
- On 18 June 2015, Arne Berg, 65, of Dallas, Texas, surfaced after diving Spiegel Grove and became unresponsive. He was taken aboard a dive vessel, where crew members performed CPR. Berg was taken to shore at the Port Largo subdivision and transported to Mariners Hospital in Tavernier, where he was pronounced dead just before noon.
- On 24 April 2017, Robert Gaskins, 61, of Clinton, Michigan, became unresponsive on the wreck, then was brought back aboard the boat and then to shore at the Port Largo Homeowner's Park. Paramedics met the boat and transported him to Mariners Hospital, where he was pronounced dead.
- On 8 May 2017, James Ringold, 52, of Lawrenceville, GA, was on a trip with his wife when other divers located him around 10:15 a.m. in about 50 feet (15 m) of water, according to the Monroe County Sheriff's Office. Ringold, who was aboard the commercial dive vessel Rainbow Reef, was unresponsive when he was found with his regulator out of his mouth in the vicinity of Spiegel Grove. Ringold was brought onto the boat, where CPR was performed as he was brought to shore. Paramedics met the vessel and took Ringold to Mariners Hospital, where he was pronounced dead at 11:41 a.m.

== Gallery ==
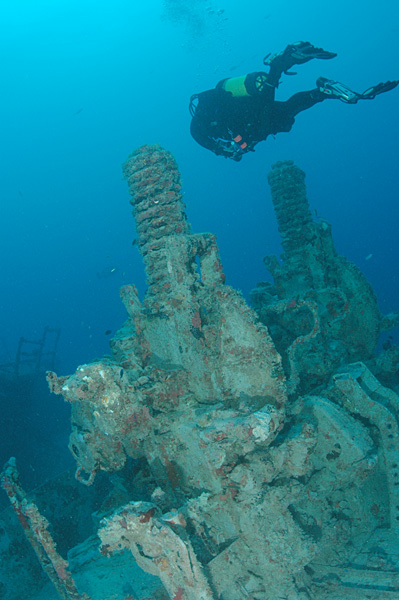
Diver near an old gun mount

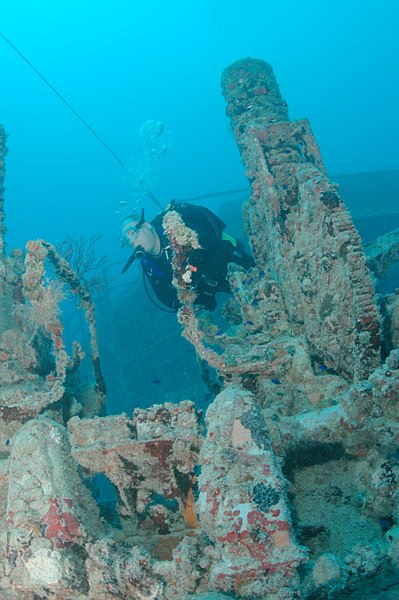
Diver near an old gun mount

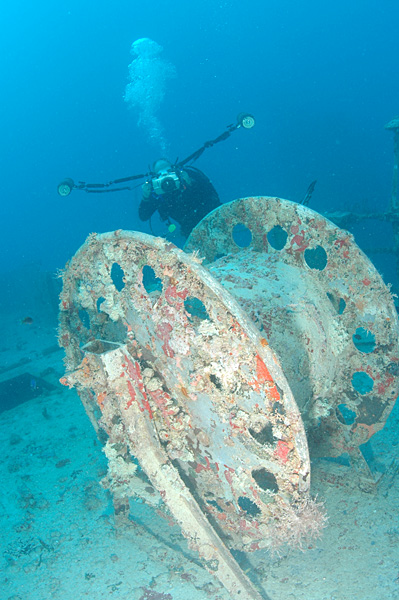
Diver photographing a large reel on deck

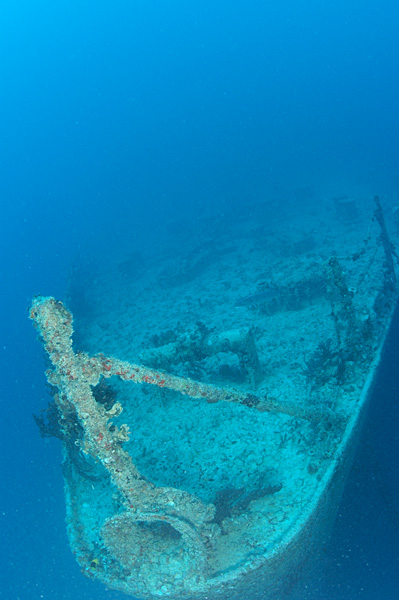
Bow of USS Spiegel Grove

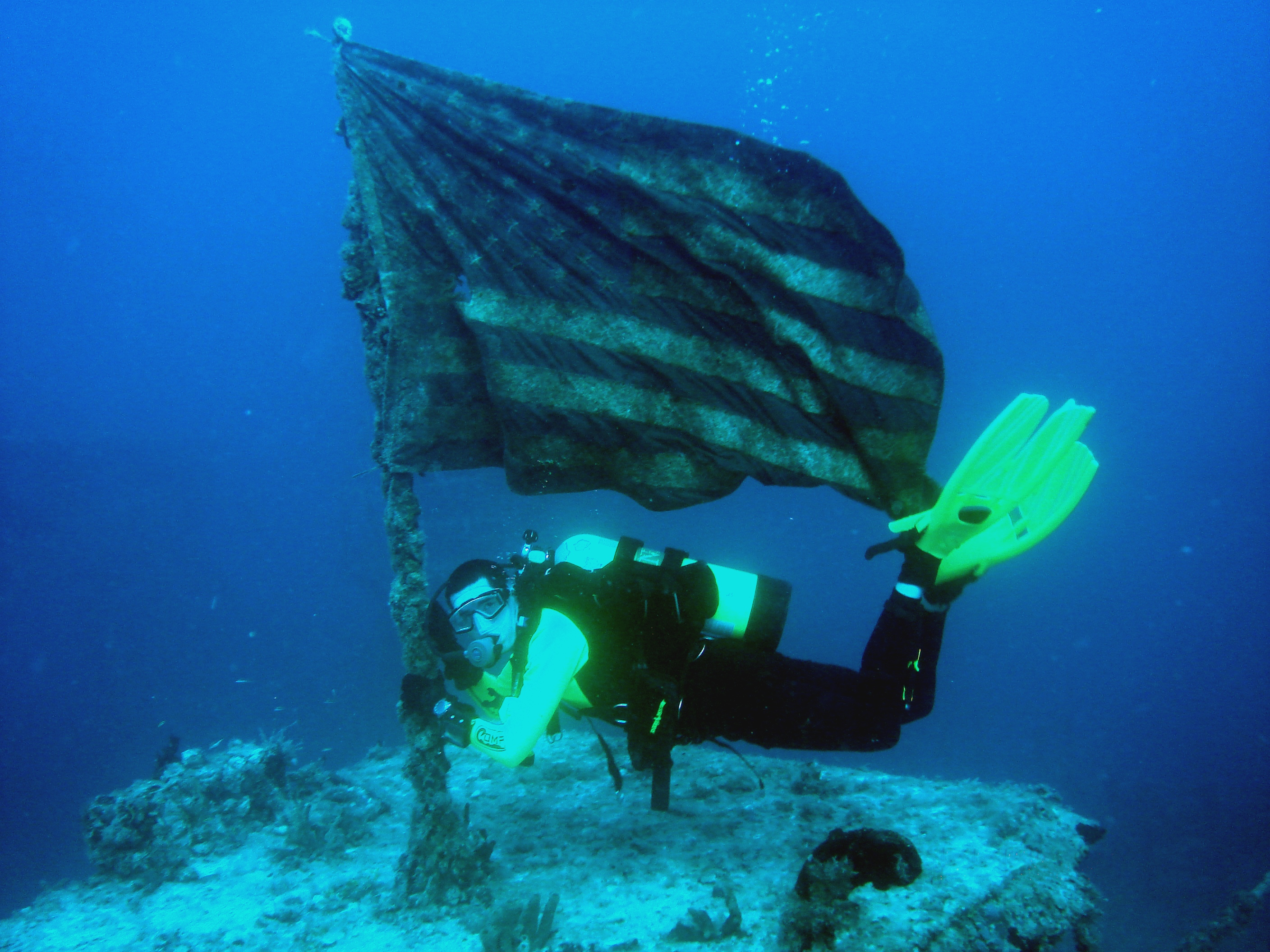
Diver posing near flag on deck

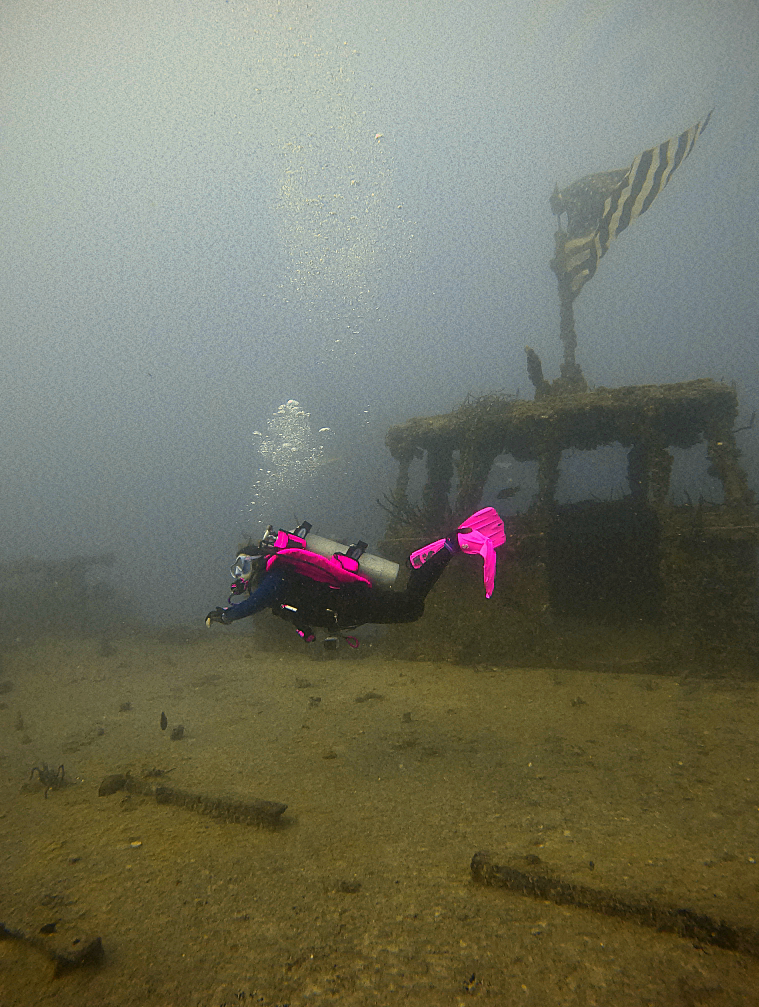
The US Flag on USS Spiegel Grove
