= USS Fort Snelling (LSD-30) =

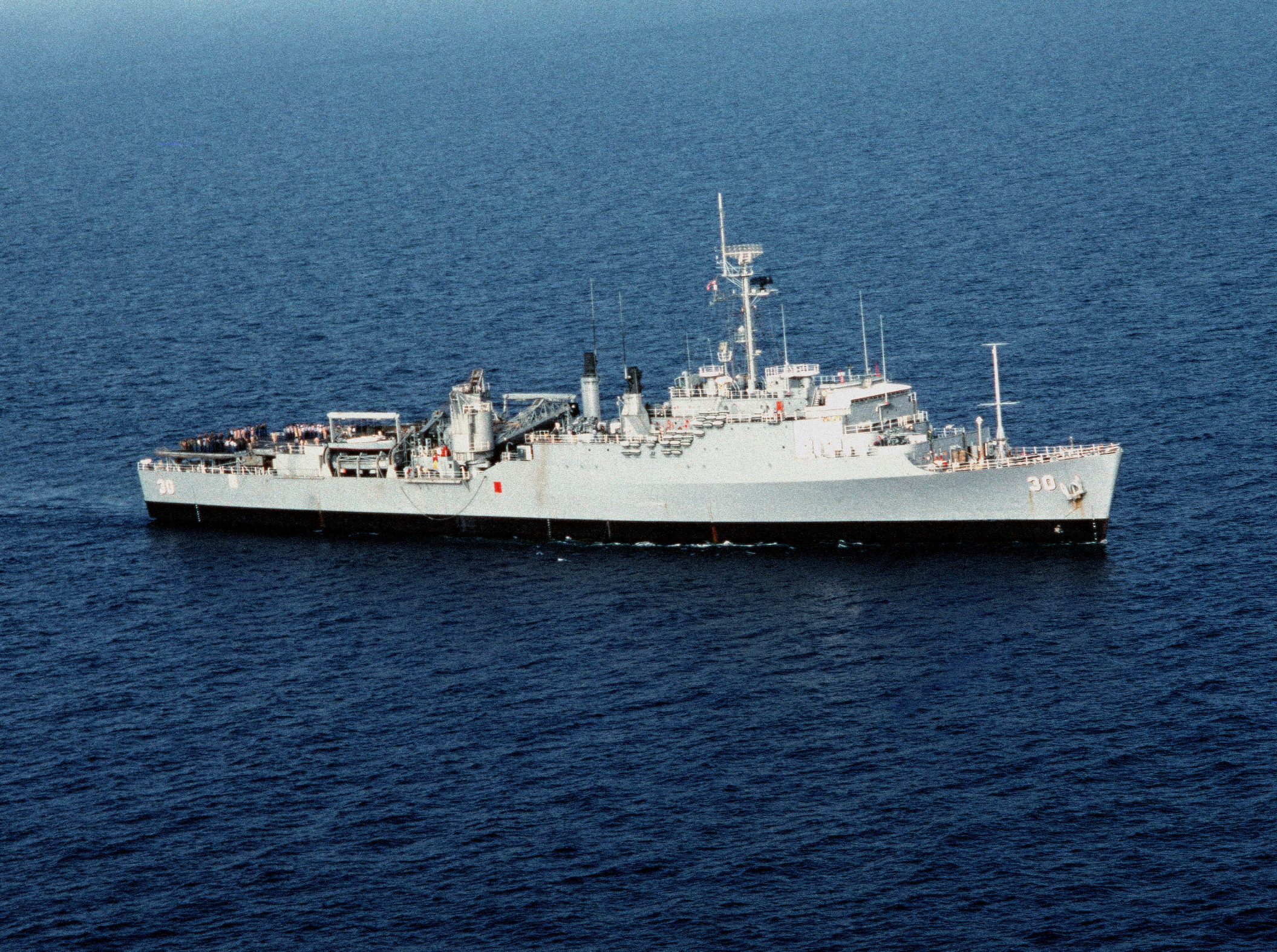
- USS Fort Snelling (LSD-30) off Lebanon in 1984

History

United States
- Name: USS Fort Snelling
- Namesake: Fort Snelling in Minnesota
- Awarded: 28 February 1952
- Builder: Ingalls Shipbuilding, Pascagoula, Mississippi
- Laid down: 17 August 1953
- Launched: 16 July 1954
- Commissioned: 24 January 1955
- Decommissioned: 28 September 1984
- Stricken: 24 February 1992
- Fate: Sold for scrap, 25 August 1995

General characteristics
- Class & type: Thomaston-class dock landing ship
- Displacement: 8,899 long tons (9,042 t) light; 11,525 long tons (11,710 t) full load
- Length: 510 ft (160 m)
- Beam: 84 ft (26 m)
- Draft: 19 ft (5.8 m)
- Propulsion: 2 × steam turbines, 2 shafts, 23,000 shp (17 MW)
- Speed: 21 knots (39 km/h; 24 mph)
- Boats & landing craft carried: 21 × LCM-6 landing craft in well deck
- Troops: 300
- Complement: 304
- Armament: 4 × twin 3 in (76 mm)/50 cal guns; 6 × twin 20 mm AA guns
- Aircraft carried: One helicopter
- Aviation facilities: Helicopter landing area wood plank construction; no hangar

USS Fort Snelling (LSD-30) was a Thomaston-class dock landing ship of the United States Navy. She was named for Fort Snelling at the confluence of the Minnesota and Mississippi Rivers, for many years the northernmost military post in the land of the Sioux and Chippewa. She was the second ship assigned that name, but the construction of Fort Snelling (LSD-23) was canceled on 17 August 1945.

Fort Snelling (LSD-30) was laid down on 17 August 1953 by Ingalls Shipbuilding Corp., Pascagoula, Miss.; launched on 16 July 1954, sponsored by Mrs. Robert P. Briscoe, wife of Vice Admiral Briscoe; and commissioned on 24 January 1955.

== Service history ==
Homeported at Norfolk, Virginia, Fort Snelling carried out an intensive exercise schedule along the east coast and in the Caribbean, almost always with Marines embarked for amphibious training. She made her first deployment to the Mediterranean in 1956, returning the next year again to serve with the 6th Fleet. During her 1958 deployment, she was at sea bound for the island of Rhodes when on 14 July she was notified to land her Marines at Beirut, Lebanon, the next day. Thus, Fort Snelling took part in the immediate response of the U.S. Navy to the Middle Eastern crisis of summer 1958. Several times more before leaving the Mediterranean she returned to the coast of Lebanon to support the Marines ashore.

Through 1959 and 1963, Fort Snelling continued her training operations with marines in the Caribbean and on the Carolina coast. In April 1965, Fort Snelling was ordered to the Dominican Republic as part of a task force which included the USS Boxer (LPH-4), USS Rankin (AKA-103), USS Wood County (LST-1178), USS Ruchamakin (APD-89), USS Yancey (AKA-93) and USS Raleigh (LPD-1). Its main mission along with the task force was to deploy marines to evacuate U.S., Canadian and British citizens. Some 14,000 marines participated.

In 1966, while returning from a Mediterranean deployment, Fort Snelling was assigned as task group commander of the Navy's Palomares Incident recovery operations. Because of her large well deck, Fort Snelling carried the deep diving submarine Aluminaut. In addition, Fort Snelling also deployed the small submarine Alvin from its flight deck via its cranes. In 1966, she participated in the extraction of U.S. Marines from the Dominican Republican crisis.

Fort Snelling was subjected to a simulated chemical agent attack in May 1969 as part of Project SHAD.

In October 1969 Fort Snelling proceeded south to the Ascension area and participated as a secondary recovery ship in the first Manned Orbiting Laboratory (MOL) test launch. As she passed the equator a raucous "crossing the line" ceremony was held in the welldeck aft. Even Captain Henry Hansen USN was initiated along with a throng of other "pollywogs.

Test flight OPS 0855 for MOL was launched on 3 November 1966 at 13:50:42 UTC on a Titan IIIC-9 from Cape Canaveral Launch Complex 40. The flight consisted of a MOL mockup built from a Titan II propellant tank, and the refurbished capsule from the Gemini 2 mission as a prototype Gemini B spacecraft.

After the Gemini B prototype separated for a sub-orbital reentry, the MOL mockup continued into orbit and released three satellites. A hatch installed in the Gemini's heat shield—intended to provide access to the MOL during crewed operations—was tested during the capsule's reentry. The Gemini capsule was recovered near Ascension Island in the South Atlantic by the USS La Salle after a flight of 33 minutes.

On 3 April 1978, Fort Snelling and the replenishment oiler Waccamaw (AO-109) collided north of Corsica when the Waccamaw lost steering control during refueling. Despite structural damage both ships proceeded under their own power to Naples, Italy, for repairs.

In August 1982, Fort Snelling embarked members of 24 MAU for a Med cruise. Over the course of 7 months, the Fort Snelling participated amphibious landings in Denmark, Germany, and Turkey, with a liberty call at the Port of Naples, Italy. After a 5-day liberty, the Fort Snelling and other members of her squadron rushed the 24 MAU to Beirut Lebanon to become the backbone of the Multi National Peacekeeping Force. In early March 1983, the 24 MAU was relieved by the 22 MAU. The 24 MAU was then returned Stateside by the Fort Snelling and her squadron mates.

In October 1983, Fort Snelling participated in Operation Urgent Fury (the US invasion of Grenada) as part of Amphibious Squadron Four (PHIBRON-4). Prior to H-hour, six frogmen from SEAL Team 4 departed the Fort Snelling in a SeaFox, a 36-foot, fiberglass-hulled craft, on a night reconnaissance mission. The team surveyed a beach on the eastern shore of the island that been identified as the preferred amphibious landing site. The beach was found unsuitable. Marines from the 22 MAU instead landed at dawn on Grenada by helicopter. Later on D-Day, the Fort Snelling and the USS Manitowoc transited to the western shore of the island to open a second front on the enemy forces. Tanks and jeeps from the Fort Snelling were put ashore after a beachhead at Grand Mal Bay was secured by 13 amphibious landing craft from the Manitowoc.

Upon conclusion of Operation Urgent Fury, Ft. Snelling continued on her deployment with PHIBRON-4 to support peacekeeping operations in Lebanon. During March 1984, Ft. Snelling assisted in the evacuation of noncombatants from Beirut, conducting flight operations and subsequently transporting hundreds of evacuees to Cyprus. The US Navy forces had published Notices to Mariners not to approach within 2,000 yards of navy ships. While Ft Snelling was conducting fueling operations with USS Sylvania, it was struck by a merchant vessel - the merchant sunk in approximately 20 minutes. Leading many to believe the collision was intentional. The damage suffered from the impact led to her decommissioning following the deployment.

Fort Snelling was decommissioned on 28 September 1984 and transferred to the Maritime Administration (MARAD) on 7 September 1989. Her name was struck from the Naval Vessel Register on 24 February 1992 and she was sold for scrapping on 25 August 1995 to Peck Recycling, Richmond, Virginia, for $268,707.
