= Defy =

To defy means to challenge or combat.

Defy may refer to:

- Defy Appliances, a South African appliance manufacturer
- Motorola Defy, an Android-based smartphone from Motorola
- Defy (album), a 2018 album by Of Mice & Men
- Defy TV, an American free-to-air television network
- Defy Media, a defunct American digital media company
- Defy Thirst, an American non-profit organization

== See also ==
- Defi (disambiguation)
- Defiance (disambiguation)
- Defiant (disambiguation)
