= USS Monticello (LSD-35) =

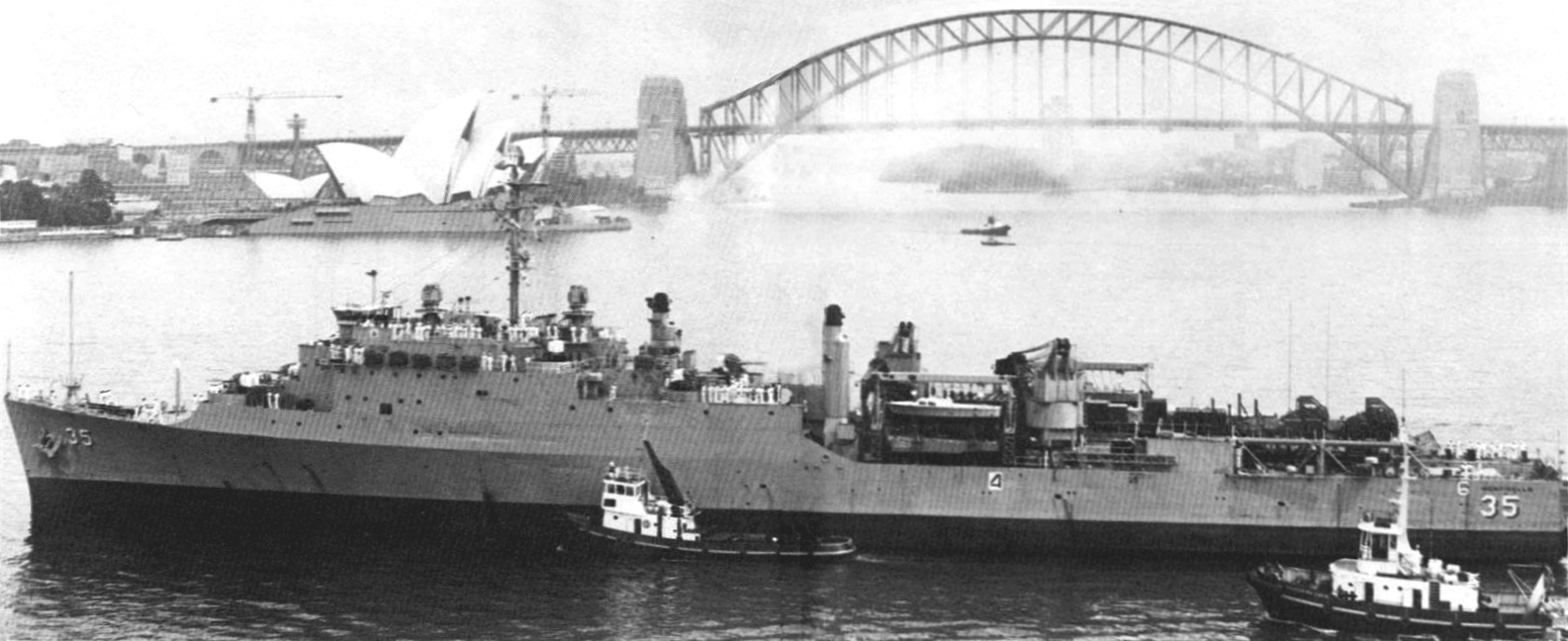
- USS Monticello (LSD-35) at Sydney, in 1971

History

United States
- Name: USS Monticello
- Namesake: Monticello
- Builder: Ingalls Shipbuilding, Pascagoula, Mississippi
- Laid down: 6 June 1955
- Launched: 10 August 1956
- Commissioned: 29 March 1957
- Decommissioned: 1 October 1985
- Stricken: 24 February 1992
- Fate: Sunk as target 14 July 2010

General characteristics
- Class & type: Thomaston-class dock landing ship
- Displacement: 8,899 long tons (9,042 t) light; 11,525 long tons (11,710 t) full load
- Length: 510 ft (160 m)
- Beam: 84 ft (26 m)
- Draft: 19 ft (5.8 m)
- Propulsion: 2 × steam turbines, 2 shafts, 23,000 shp (17 MW)
- Speed: 21 knots (39 km/h; 24 mph)
- Boats & landing craft carried: 21 × LCM-6 landing craft in well deck
- Troops: 300
- Complement: 304
- Armament: 4 × twin 3"/50 caliber guns; 6 × twin 20 mm AA guns
- Aircraft carried: Up to 8 helicopters
- Aviation facilities: Helicopter landing area

USS Monticello (LSD-35) was a Thomaston-class dock landing ship, the third ship of the United States Navy to be named for Monticello, Thomas Jefferson's home in Virginia.

Monticello was laid down on 6 June 1955 by Ingalls Shipbuilding Corp., Pascagoula, Mississippi; launched on 10 August 1956; sponsored by Mrs. Harry R. Sheppard, wife of Congressman Harry R. Sheppard of California; and commissioned on 29 March 1957.

== Service history ==
After outfitting and trials off the East Coast, Monticello arrived at her home port, NS San Diego, on 27 May 1957 to join Amphibious Forces, Pacific Fleet, and immediately began shakedown training. She continued to operate off the Pacific coast, joining in major amphibious training operations which took her to Eniwetok in 1958 and Hawaii and Alaska in 1959, serving usually as primary control ship. Such operations, involving ships of all types along with underwater demolition teams and Marines, keep the fleet at top readiness for any challenge of diplomatic crisis or war itself.

On 14 November 1960, Monticello sailed for a seven-month deployment with the 7th Fleet in the western Pacific. She was combat-loaded with part of a Marine reinforced battalion landing team, and was alerted four times during the Laos crisis, steaming with Paul Revere (APA-248) and four escorting destroyers in the South China Sea and the Gulf of Siam. Returning to San Diego in July, Monticello joined in a joint Army-Navy-Air Force amphibious exercise at San Juan Island, Washington, in September, then returned to fleet training operations from her home port.

Monticello sailed on 18 February 1962 in JTF 8 for nuclear weapons tests at Christmas Island, first carrying cargo between Christmas Island and San Diego, and then acting as command ship during tests of antisubmarine weapons, as part of Operation Dominic. In June, she sailed again to Christmas Island to aid in closing down the test operation, and continued to a second 7th Fleet tour of duty highlighted by a large amphibious exercise at Okinawa. She returned to San Diego and a program of training with Camp Pendleton marines, necessary overhaul, and refresher training early in December.

She again joined the 7th Fleet's Amphibious Ready Group from January to October 1964, taking part in SEATO as well as U.S. exercises.

She left San Diego in August of 1965 for Chu Lai, Vietnam, then on to Yokosuka, Japan for drydock and repairs. She returned to the South China Sea for patrolling duties. She participated in the Blue Marlin and Harvest Moon landings as well as Operation Dagger Thrust Early in 1966, she steamed to South Vietnam for "Operation Double Eagle" the longest and largest amphibious operation of the Vietnam War up to that time. It enabled Allied forces to engage Viet Cong near Thac Tru and secure a beachhead in a key area. At the operation's conclusion, on 26 February, she headed for Subic Bay en route home via Hong Kong, Yokosuka, and Pearl Harbor.

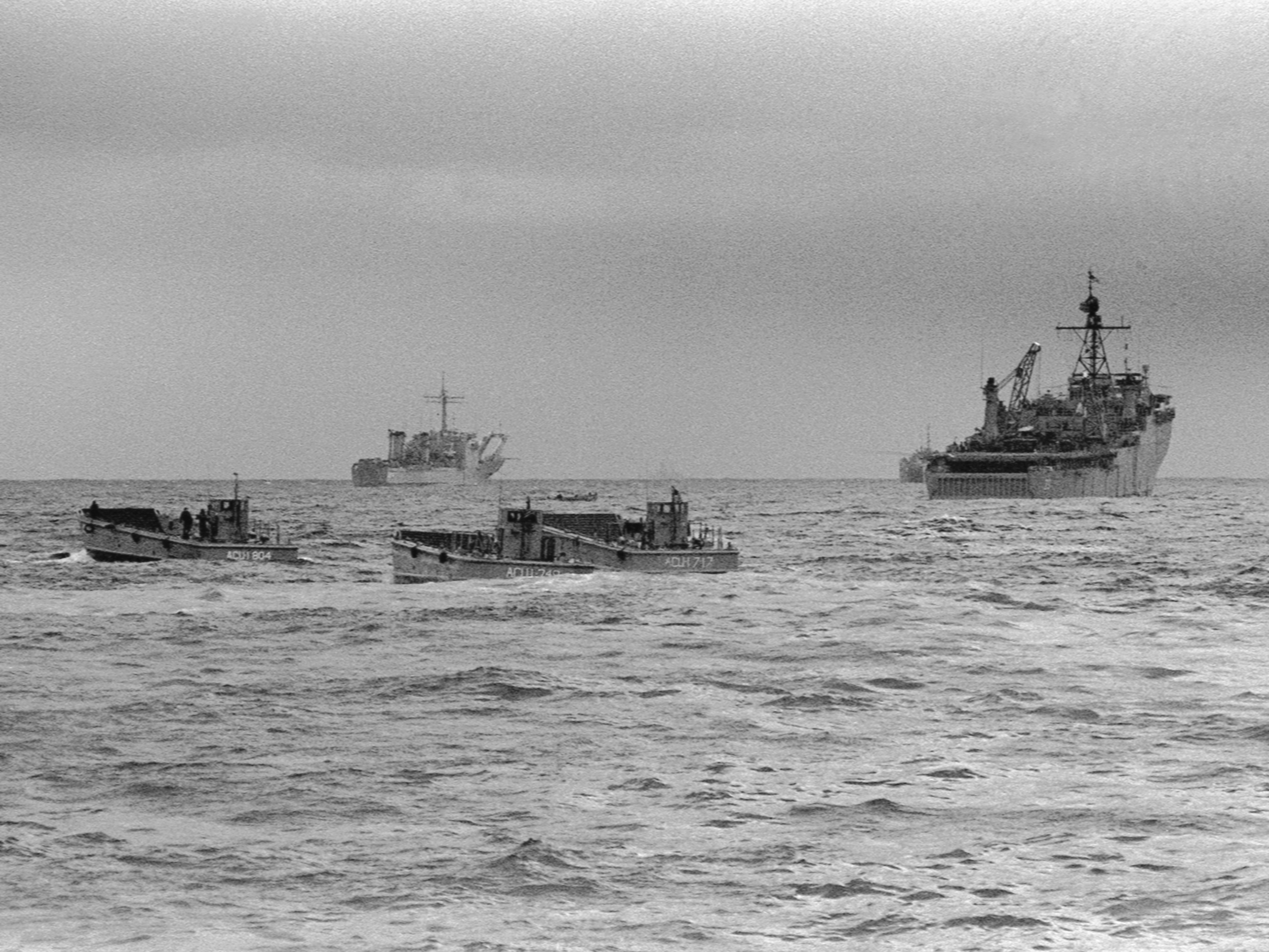
Monticello off Korea in 1982.

After overhaul at San Pedro and training along the Pacific coast, Monticello got underway from San Diego on 13 January 1967, heading for the Far East. Much action awaited her in Vietnam. She served as primary command ship for Operation Beacon Hill I in Quảng Trị Province from 20 March to 2 April and Beacon Star there from 22 April to 12 May. She joined in Operation Bell in the latter half of May, in Operations Beacon Torch and Bear Chain in July, and in August participated in Operation Kangaroo Kick, an amphibious feint off Huế, and Operation Belt Drive, again at Quang Tri. Relieved at Da Nang in September. Monticello returned to San Diego on 13 October. After an overhaul that lasted until early 1968, Monticello conducted refresher training and local operations out of San Diego. In November of that year, she once again deployed to Vietnam where she remained into 1969.

[1969-1985]

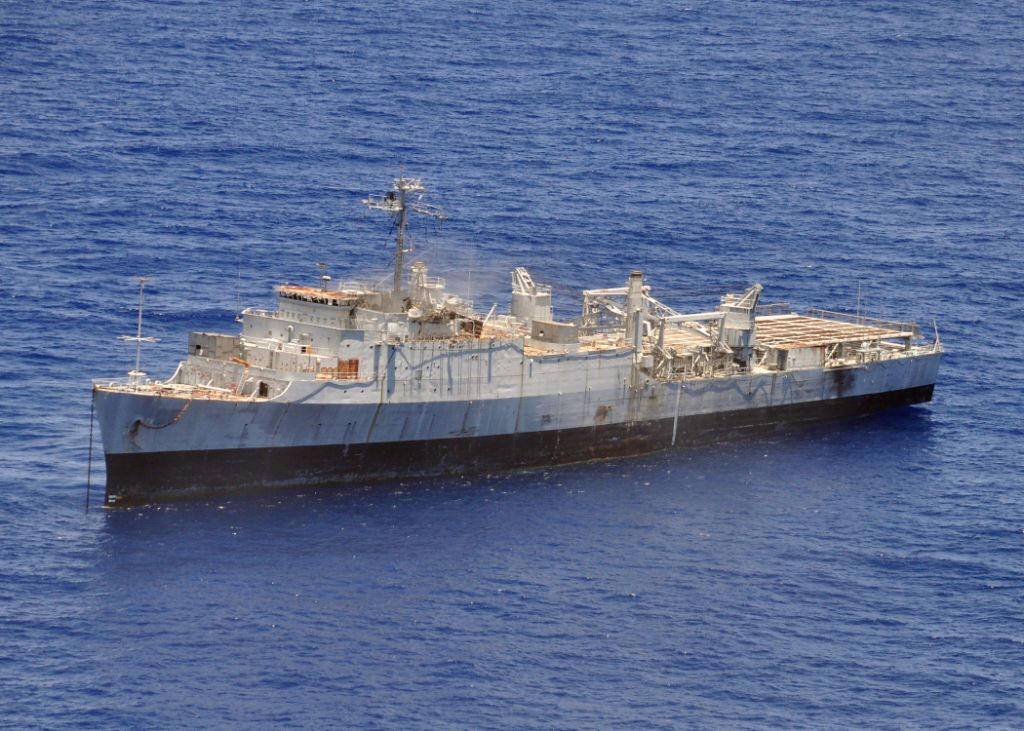
Monticello as a target ship during RIMPAC 2010.

Monticello was decommissioned on 1 October 1985 and transferred to the US Maritime Administration on 2 August 1991. Her name was struck from the Navy list on 24 February 1992 and she was sold on 29 September 1995 to Pegasus Inc for scrapping. She was repossessed by the Navy on 1 July 1997 after the failure of Pegasus to dismantle the ship and was re-transferred to the United States Maritime Administration and docked in the National Defense Reserve Fleet, Suisun Bay, Benicia, California. Ex-Monticello was environmentally cleaned to be used for target practice by Marad Contract #N00140-03C-A002 from 9 March through 27 April 2006 and then the vessel was returned to the Suisun Bay Reserve Fleet.

Ex-Monticello was withdrawn from the National Defense Reserve Fleet, Suisun Bay, Benicia, California on 27 June 2010, to be towed to Hawaii for sinking, in July 2010, as part of the RIMPAC 2010 exercise. She was sunk as a target in the Pacific Ocean 70 nautical miles (81 mi; 130 km) off Kauai, Hawaii, on 14 July 2010 by aircraft of the U.S. Navy's Patrol Squadron 4 (VP-4) and Patrol Squadron 40 (VP-40).

== Awards, citations, and campaign ribbons ==

Combat Action Ribbon w/ 2 award stars	Navy Unit Commendation w/ 1 service star	Navy Meritorious Unit Commendation
National Defense Service Medal	Armed Forces Expeditionary Medal w/ 4 service stars	Vietnam Service Medal w/ 12 service stars
Humanitarian Service Medal	Republic of Vietnam Gallantry Cross Unit Citation (12)	Republic of Vietnam Campaign Medal
