= HMS Forth (A187) =

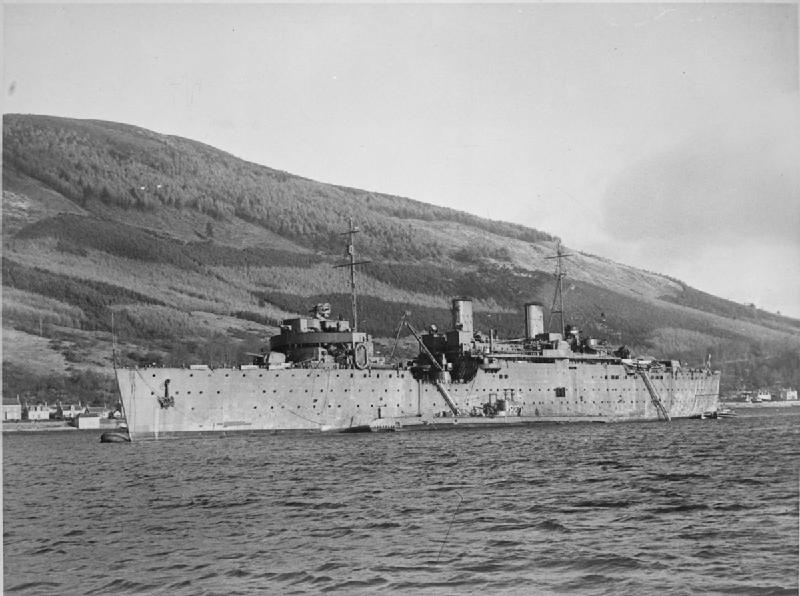

History

United Kingdom
- Name: HMS Forth
- Builder: John Brown & Company, Clydebank, Scotland
- Laid down: 30 June 1937
- Launched: 11 August 1938
- Commissioned: 14 May 1939
- Decommissioned: 1 January 1979
- Renamed: HMS Defiance, 15 February 1972–21 April 1978
- Fate: Sold for scrapping, 25 July 1985

General characteristics
- Class & type: Maidstone-class submarine depot ship
- Displacement: 8,900 long tons (9,043 t)
- Length: 497 ft (151 m)
- Beam: 73 ft (22 m)
- Speed: 17 knots (31 km/h; 20 mph)
- Complement: 1,167 men
- Armament: 8 × 4.5 in (110 mm) DP guns (2x2); 8 × 2-pounder AA guns (2×4)

HMS Forth, pennant number F04 later A187, was a submarine depot ship.

Forth was completed in 1939. She served at bases in Scotland, including Holy Loch on the Firth of Clyde, and at Halifax in Canada during the Second World War.

During the war Forth was adopted by Stirlingshire as part of Warship Week. The plaque from this adoption is held by the National Museum of the Royal Navy in Portsmouth.

During her stay in Malta in the 1950s she was moored on the east side of Msida creek. In 1953 she took part in the Fleet Review to celebrate the Coronation of Queen Elizabeth II. She left Malta in 1960.

She was modified to support the Royal Navy's nuclear-powered submarines at H.M.Dockyard Chatham between 1962 and 1966.

She arrived in Singapore in mid-1966 to relieve HMS Medway (former landing craft tank HMS LCT 1109) as depot ship of the 7th Submarine Squadron. She left Singapore to return to the United Kingdom on 31 March 1971.

In 1968, HMS Forth transported the first hovercraft (a small two or three seater) to Australia.
