= Defi =

Defi may refer to:

- DéFI (Démocrate fédéraliste indépendant), a political party in Belgium
- Defi language
- Défi sportif, disabled multisport event
- Le Défi, a defunct America's Cup syndicate from France
- Le Défi Media Group, mass media company in Mauritius
- 10332 Défi, a main belt asteroid discovered in 1991
- Decentralized finance, a form of finance based on cryptocurrencies

== See also ==
- Defy (disambiguation)
