= Point Defiance =

Point Defiance may refer to:

- Point Defiance Park in Tacoma, Washington, USA
  - Point Defiance Zoo & Aquarium within the park
- USS Point Defiance (LSD-31), a dock landing ship
- Point Defiance Elementary School, a school located within Tacoma, Washington
- Point Defiance Bypass, a rail line in Pierce County, Washington, USA
