= HMS Defiance =

Twelve ships and two shore establishments of the Royal Navy have been named HMS Defiance. Others have borne the name whilst serving as depot ships and tenders to the establishments:

- English ship Defiance (1588) was an 8-gun pinnace that took part in the action against the Spanish Armada in 1588.
- English ship Defiance (1590) was a 46-gun galleon built in 1590. She was rebuilt and reduced to 34 guns in 1614 and was sold in 1650.
- English ship Defiance (1652) was a 10-gun ship captured from the Parliamentarians by the Royalists in 1652 during the English Civil War. She foundered later in 1652.
- HMS Defiance (1666) was a 66-gun third rate ship of the line launched in 1666 and burned by accident in 1668.
- HMS Defiance (1671) was a sloop in service between 1671 and 1678.
- HMS Defiance (1675) was a 64-gun third rate launched in 1675. She was rebuilt in 1695, reduced to a fourth rate in 1716, hulked in 1743 and broken up in 1749.
- HMS Defiance (1744) was a 69-gun fourth rate launched in 1744 and sold in 1766.
- HMS Defiance (1766) was a sloop launched in 1766.
- HMS Defiance (1772) was a 64-gun third rate launched in 1772 and wrecked in 1780 off the Savannah River.
- HMS Defiance (1783) was a 74-gun third rate of launched in 1783. She was used as a prison ship from 1813 and was broken up in 1817.
- HMS Defiance (1794) was a 4-gun gunboat purchased in 1794 and sold in 1797.
- HMS Defiance (1861) was a 91-gun screw propelled second rate launched in 1861. She became the Navy's torpedo school ship in 1884 and was sold in 1931.
- HMS Defiance (shore establishment 1884) was the Royal Navy's torpedo school, established in 1884 in the second rate HMS Defiance (1861), and in subsequent ships that were renamed HMS Defiance. These included:
  - HMS Defiance was the original school ship from 1884 until 1931.
  - HMS Perseus was HMS Defiance II from 1904 until 1931.
  - HMS Spartan was HMS Defiance II from 1921 until 1931.
  - HMS Cleopatra was HMS Defiance III from 1922 until 1931.
  - HMS Inconstant was HMS Defiance IV from 1922 until 1930 and HMS Defiance II from 1930 until 1956.
  - HMS Andromeda was HMS Defiance from 1931 until 1956.
  - HMS Vulcan was HMS Defiance III from 1931 until 1955.

The school moved ashore at Portsmouth in 1955, becoming a stone frigate. It was paid off in 1959.

- HMS Defiance (shore establishment 1970) was the Fleet Maintenance Base at HMNB Devonport between 1972 and 1979, and again between 1981 and 1994 when it was absorbed into the main base. One ship was renamed HMS Defiance whilst serving as the establishment's depot ship.
  - HMS Forth was HMS Defiance from 1972 until 1978.

== Other British military vessels named Defiance ==
- Defiance was a gunboat that the garrison at Gibraltar launched in June 1782 during the Great Siege of Gibraltar. She was one of 12. Each was armed with an 18-pounder gun, and received a crew of 21 men drawn from Royal Navy vessels stationed at Gibraltar. Brilliant provided Defiance's crew.

== See also ==
- H.M.S. Defiant – 1962 movie
- HMAS Defiance – fictional Australian patrol boat from Patrol Boat
- USS Defiance – the name of three US Navy ships
- Defiance (disambiguation)
