= Defiant =

Defiant may refer to:

== In the Star Trek universe ==
- "Defiant" (Star Trek: Deep Space Nine), an episode of the series Star Trek: Deep Space Nine
- Star Trek: Defiant, comic book by IDW
- USS Defiant, a starship in Star Trek: Deep Space Nine and in the film Star Trek: First Contact
- USS Defiant (NCC-1764), sister ship to the Enterprise in the Star Trek: The Original Series episode "The Tholian Web"

== Transportation ==
- Boulton Paul Defiant, a British fighter aircraft of World War 2
- Defiant 300, a prototype aircraft of the Philippines
- GWR 4073 Class 5080 Defiant, a Great Western Railway locomotive
- Rutan Defiant, an aircraft designed by Burt Rutan
- Defiant (YT-804), a Valiant-class tugboat launched 2010
- Sikorsky–Boeing SB-1 Defiant, an American compound helicopter
- USS Defiant (BBG-1), a proposed US Navy battleship
- USX-1 Defiant, an American uncrewed surface vessel (USV)

== Other uses ==
- Defiant, a 2006 album by Vice Squad
- Defiant (album), a 2025 album by Jimmy Barnes
- Defiant (G.I. Joe), a fictional space shuttle complex in the toy line G.I. Joe: A Real American Hero
- Defiant Comics, a comic book publishing imprint
- Defiant, a sci-fi book by Brandon Sanderson
- Defiant Theatre, an American theatre company based in Chicago
- Defiant (2023 film), a 2023 documentary film
- Defiant (2025 film), a 2025 Finnish drama film
- The Defiant, a World War II memoir by Shalom Yoran
- The Defiant (band), American punk rock supergroup
- The Sandpit Generals, a 1971 American film also released as The Defiant
- H.M.S. Defiant, a 1962 film
- Toronto Defiant, a Canadian esports team

== See also ==
- Defiance (disambiguation)
- Defy (disambiguation)
- Disobedience
