= Camilla (1800 ship) =

History

Great Britain
- Name: Camilla
- Owner: Shane & Co.
- Launched: 1799, France
- Acquired: 1800 by purchase of a prize
- Captured: Late 1800 or early 1801

General characteristics
- Tons burthen: 285 (bm)
- Complement: 38
- Armament: 18 × 9-pounder guns

Camilla was built in France in 1799 and was taken in prize by the British. Camillia first appeared in Lloyd's Register (LR) in 1800 with Caitchern, master, Swane & Co., owners, and trade London–Barbados. Captain Robert Hunter Caitchion acquired a letter of marque on 20 August 1800.

LL reported on 16 January 1801 that the French privateer Mouche had captured three vessels: (Note: Mouche probably was a 14-gun privateer from Dunkirk commissioned in 1799. She did a first cruise under Pierre-François Lefebvre, from Calais, with 60 men and 14 guns, from 1799 to 1800. She made a second cruise in 1801 under a Captain A.-T. Warnier, from Calais, with 43 men and 14 guns. Her third cruise took place under Pierre-François Lefebvre with about 60 men and 14 guns from August 1801 to later the same year.)

- Camilla, Calcheon, master, sailing from London to Barbados;
- Defiance, Pervis, master, Liverpool to Madeira; and
- Elizabeth, Liverpool to Demerara.

The entry for Camilla in the 1801 volume of Lloyd's Register carried the annotation "Captured".
