= USNS Taurus =

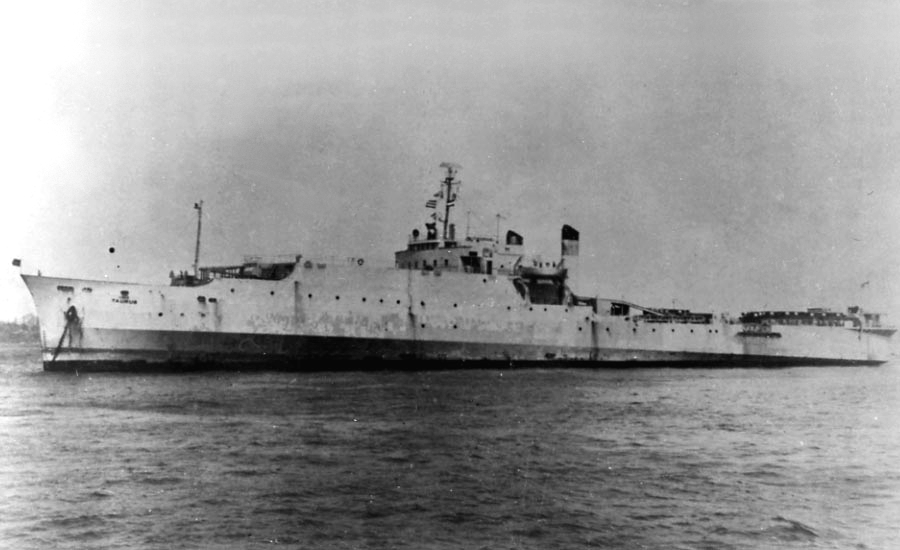
- USNS Taurus

History

United States
- Name: USNS Taurus
- Builder: Gulf Shipbuilding Corporation, Chickasaw, Alabama
- Laid down: 8 November 1944
- Completed: 1956 as SS Carib Queen
- In service: 15 January 1959, as USNS Taurus (T-AK-273)
- Out of service: September 1968
- Reclassified: T-LSV-8 (Landing Ship Vehicle), 1 January 1963
- Stricken: 22 June 1971
- Fate: Sold for scrapping, 25 June 1969

General characteristics
- Type: Cargo ship
- Displacement: 9,950 long tons (10,110 t)
- Length: 475 ft (145 m)
- Beam: 72 ft (22 m)
- Draft: 19 ft (5.8 m)
- Propulsion: 2 geared turbines, 2 shafts
- Speed: 16 knots (30 km/h; 18 mph)
- Complement: 69

USNS Taurus (T-AK-273) was a Landing Ship Vehicle built for the United States Navy. The lone ship of her class, she was named for the constellation Taurus, and was the second U.S. Naval vessel to bear the name.

== Construction ==
Taurus was laid down as the dock landing ship USS Fort Snelling (LSD-23) on 8 November 1944 at Chickasaw, Alabama, by the Gulf Shipbuilding Corporation. The end of World War II made her services unnecessary, and the Navy cancelled the contract for her acquisition. The unchristened hull changed hands twice before being completed in 1956 as the roll-on/roll-off ship SS Carib Queen for Trailer Marine Transport, Inc. In 1957, the ship received a Military Sea Transportation Service (MSTS) charter for transatlantic service. However, problems in her propulsion system caused delays and repairs which prevented her actually serving MSTS. In March, 1958 after Trailer Marine Transport, Inc. had defaulted on her mortgage, the Maritime Administration took over the vessel. She was assigned to MSTS on 15 January 1959, renamed Taurus, and designated T-AK-273.

== Service history ==
In May, 1959 Taurus made her first cargo run, from New York City to St. Nazaire. Over the next nine years, she continued to carry cargo for MSTS in the Atlantic and Pacific oceans. On 1 January 1963 Taurus was re-designated vehicle landing ship LSV-8. During the mid-1960s she carried cargo to ports in South Vietnam in support of American forces in the Vietnam War. She also was used by NASA, along with USNS Point Barrow (T-AKD-1), to carry S-IVB and S-II stages of the Saturn V Moon rocket from their production facilities in California to the Mississippi Test Facility and the Kennedy Space Center during the mid-1960s. Never commissioned, Taurus went out of service at Yokosuka, Japan, in September 1968. She was transferred back to the Maritime Administration on 25 June 1969, and was sold on the same day to the Union Minerals and Alloy Corporation of New York City. Her name was struck from the Naval Vessel Register on 22 June 1971. Her final fate is unknown.
