= Defiance (1802 ship) =

1803 French Ship

History

United Kingdom
- Name: Defiance
- Acquired: 1802 by purchase of a prize
- Fate: Wrecked December 1802

General characteristics
- Tons burthen: 267 (bm)
- Complement: 30

Defiance was a French vessel that first appeared in Lloyd's Register in 1803 with N.Long, master, Gibbons & Co., owners, and trade London–South Seas. That is, she intended to sail as a whaler. She sailed for the South Seas on 7 December 1802, but immediately put into Ramsgate, having sustained damage when she ran on to the Brake. She was driven ashore and wrecked on the coast of France in late December 1802. Captain Nathan Long (of Nantucket), her mate, and seven other crew drowned; 21 crew survived.

It is highly likely that this Defiance is the Defiance that made three voyages as a slave ship and that a privateer captured in late 1800.
