= Defiance (1795 ship) =

History

Great Britain
- Name: Defiance
- Builder: Hambro
- Launched: 1790
- Captured: Late 1800

General characteristics
- Tons burthen: 267, or 276 (bm)
- Complement: 1795:30; 1800:25
- Armament: 1795: 10 × 6-pounder guns + 6 swivel guns; 1800: 12 × 6-pounder guns + 2 × 18-pounder carronades

Defiance was launched in Hamburg in 1790, probably under another name. She started sailing out of London in 1795 as a slave ship in the triangular trade in enslaved people. She made three voyages as a slave ship between 1795 and 1800. She then left that trade but a French privateer captured her late in 1800.

== Career ==
Defiance first appeared in Lloyd's Register (LR) in 1795 with J.Kimber, master, Parry & Co., owners, and trade London–Africa. She had damages repaired in 1795.

Dolben's Act limited the number of enslaved people that British slave ships could transport without penalty, based on the ships' tons burthen. For Defiance, the cap would have been 406. One of the provisions of the act was bonuses for the master (£100) and surgeon (£50) if the mortality among the captives was under 2%; a mortality rate of under 3% resulted in a bonus of half that. Dolben's Act was the first British legislation passed to regulate slave shipping. Dolben's Act apparently resulted in some reduction in the numbers of captives carried per vessel, and possibly in mortality, though the evidence is ambiguous.

=== 1st voyage transporting enslaved people (1795–1797) ===
Captain John Kimber acquired a letter of marque on 1 December 1795. He sailed from London on 25 November 1795, bound for the Bight of Benin. Defiance arrived in Africa and began gathering captives on 10 March 1796. She gathered the captives first at the "Lamo River", and then at Cape Coast Castle. She departed Africa on 29 October, and arrived at Tobago on 5 December. She had embarked 401 captives and she delivered 399, for a mortality rate of less than 1%, which would qualify her master and surgeon for the full bonus. She arrived back in London on 30 April 1797.

=== 2nd voyage transporting enslaved people (1797–1798) ===
Captain Kimber sailed from Gravesend on 5 October 1797. Defiance arrived in Africa and began gathering slaves on 30 November. She gathered her slaves at Cape Lahou, Keta, and Cape Coast Castle. She sailed from Africa on 1 April 1798, and arrived at Barbados on 11 May 1798. She had embarked 409 convicts and she delivered 408, for a mortality rate of less than 1%. While she was in Barbados she was sold there. She sailed for London on 23 June, and arrived there on 14 August.

=== 3rd voyage transporting enslaved people (1799–1800) ===
Captain Moses Joynson sailed from Liverpool on 11 May 1799. Defiance arrived at Kingston, Jamaica on 25 November with 389 captives. (She had first stopped at Demerara.) She arrived back at Liverpool on 9 March 1800. She had left Liverpool with 40 crew members and she suffered six crew deaths in her voyage.

=== Subsequent career and fate ===
Captain Joseph Purvis acquired a letter of marque on 8 August 1800. Neither Lloyd's Register nor the Register of Shipping caught the change. (The registers were only as accurate as vessel owners bothered to keep them informed.) He then sailed her to Madeira.

Lloyd's List reported on 16 January 1801 that the French privateer Mouche had captured three vessels: (Note: Mouche probably was a 14-gun privateer from Dunkirk commissioned in 1799. She did a first cruise under Pierre-François Lefebvre, from Calais, with 60 men and 14 guns, from 1799 to 1800. She made a second cruise in 1801 under a Captain A.-T. Warnier, from Calais, with 43 men and 14 guns. Her third cruise took place under Pierre-François Lefebvre with about 60 men and 14 guns from August 1801 to later the same year.)

- Camilla, Calcheon, master, sailing from London to Barbados;
- Defiance, Pervis, master, Liverpool to Madeira; and
- Elizabeth, Liverpool to Demerara.

It is highly likely that this Defiance is the Defiance that British interests purchased in France in 1802 during the Peace of Amiens. Her owners sent her on a voyage as a whaler but she was lost in late December at the very outset of her voyage.
