= USS Defiance =

USS Defiance may refer to the following ships of the United States Navy:

- USS Defiance (ID-3327), a cargo vessel in service from 1918–1919
- USS Defiance (AMc-73), a coastal minesweeper that served during World War II
- USS Defiance (PG-95), a patrol gunboat that served from 1969 until 1973 when it was transferred to Turkey

== See also ==
- Defiance (disambiguation)
- USS Point Defiance (LSD-31)
- Defiant (YT-804), U.S. Navy tugboat
- USX-1 Defiant, a DARPA uncrewed surface vessel U.S. drone warship
