= Fort Defiance =

Fort Defiance may refer to:

Canada

- Fort Defiance (British Columbia), winter quarters for American Captain Robert Gray

United States

- Fort Defiance, Arizona, an unincorporated community
- Fort Defiance (California), formerly Roop's Fort, located in Susanville
- Fort Morris, Georgia, known as Fort Defiance during the War of 1812
- Fort Defiance (Illinois), a Civil War post commanded by General Ulysses S. Grant, site of Fort Defiance Park
- Fort Defiance State Park near Estherville, Iowa
- Fort Defiance (Maryland), a War of 1812 fort on the Elk River
- Fort Defiance (Massachusetts), a 19th-century fort in Gloucester
- Fort Defiance (Brooklyn), a fort in the neighborhood of Red Hook, Brooklyn, New York during the American Revolution
- Fort Defiance (Lenoir, North Carolina), former plantation home of General William Lenoir
- Fort Defiance (Ohio), in present-day Defiance, Ohio
- Gordon Stockade, South Dakota, initially called Fort Defiance
- Fort Defiance, Tennessee, in Clarksville TN, later renamed Fort Bruce
- Fort Defiance, briefly the name of the Presidio La Bahía in Goliad, Texas during the Texas Revolution
- Fort Defiance (Vermont), a fort in Vermont
- Fort Defiance, Virginia, an unincorporated community
- Fort Defiance (Wisconsin), a fort during the Black Hawk War

In film

- Fort Defiance (film), a 1951 Western directed by John Rawlins
