= Defy Thirst =

American non-profit organization

Defy Thirst is a 501(c)(3) non-profit organization and sub-branch of Defiant Missions Inc. that provides clean, safe drinking water to people in impoverished and developing countries. Founded in 2009 by Matthew Ayers Turner and Stephen Dupuis, the Atlanta-based organization developed and implements unique water filtration systems that have been installed in countries including Ecuador, Ghana, Haiti, and Honduras.
