= Thomaston-class dock landing ship =

Class of dock landing ships

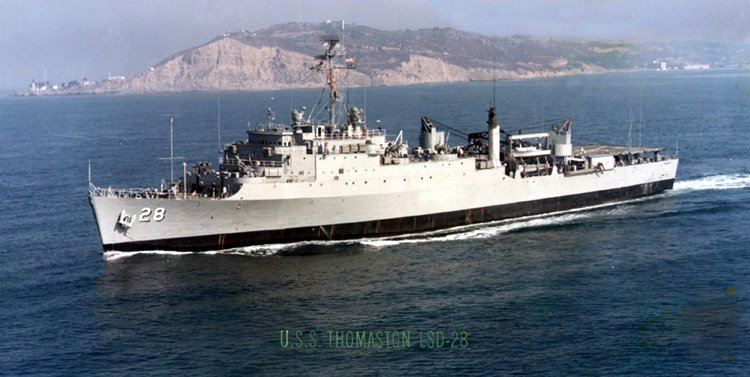
- USS Thomaston

Class overview
- Name: Thomaston class
- Builders: Ingalls Shipbuilding, Pascagoula, Mississippi
- Operators: United States Navy; Brazilian Navy
- Preceded by: Casa Grande class
- Succeeded by: Anchorage class
- Built: 1953–1956
- In commission: 1954–2016
- Completed: 8
- Retired: 8

General characteristics
- Type: Dock landing ship
- Displacement: 11,800 long tons (11,989 t) full load
- Length: 510 ft (160 m)
- Beam: 84 ft (26 m)
- Propulsion: 2 × 600 psi boilers, 2 × geared turbines, 2 shafts, 24,000 shp (17,897 kW)
- Speed: 22 knots (41 km/h; 25 mph)+
- Boats & landing craft carried: 3 × LCU or 9 × LCM-8 or 50 × AAV/LVTP-7 amphibious tractors
- Troops: 325
- Complement: 348 (18 officers, 330 enlisted)
- Armament: 16 × 3 in (76 mm)/50 cal Mk.33 AA guns (8 twin mounts)
- Aviation facilities: Helicopter landing area

The Thomaston class was a class of eight dock landing ships built for the United States Navy in the 1950s.

The class is named after a town of Thomaston, Maine, which was the home of General Henry Knox, the first Secretary of War to serve under the United States Constitution.

== Design ==
The Thomaston class was the third class of U.S. Navy dock landing ships. The class was designed under project SCB 75 and approved in the early 1950s. Compared to the Ashland and Casa Grande-class dock landing ships of World War II, the ships of this class were about a third larger and five knots faster. The class was designed to be able to transport:

- 3 Landing Craft Utility, or
- 9 LCM-8 Landing Craft Mechanized, or
- 16 LCM-6, or
- ca. 50 LVT-5 or later LVTP-7.

The dock was covered by removable segments that were able to carry the weight of two medium helicopters. Both cranes could lift weights of up to 50 tons. The machinery spaces were located underneath the dock, in contrast to the earlier Ashland class, where the machinery spaces were located to port and starboard of the dock.

Originally, all ships were armed with eight 3"/50 caliber gun Mark 33 twin mounts. The number was later reduced.

Spiegel Grove was a trial ship for the Jeff(A) and Jeff(B) landing craft in the mid-1980s. Jeff(B) was then developed into the Landing Craft Air Cushion. All ships were decommissioned by the U.S. Navy between 1983 and 1990, Alamo and Hermitage were sold to Brazil in 1989–1990.

== Ships in class ==
Ship Name	Hull number	Commissioned	Decommissioned	Fate
Thomaston	LSD-28	17 September 1954	28 September 1984	Sold for scrap, 28 July 2011
Plymouth Rock	LSD-29	29 November 1954	30 September 1983	Sold for scrap, 25 August 1995
Fort Snelling	LSD-30	24 January 1955	28 September 1984	Sold for scrap, 25 August 1995
Point Defiance	LSD-31	31 March 1955	30 September 1983	Sold for scrap, 28 July 2011
Spiegel Grove	LSD-32	8 June 1956	2 October 1989	Sunk as an artificial reef, 2002
Alamo	LSD-33	24 August 1956	28 September 1990	Transferred to Brazil, 12 November 1990; scrapped in Alang India 2015.
Hermitage	LSD-34	14 December 1956	2 October 1989	Transferred to Brazil, 2 October 1989; sunk as target 2021.
Monticello	LSD-35	29 March 1957	1 October 1985	Sunk as a target, 14 July 2010
