= USS Point Defiance =

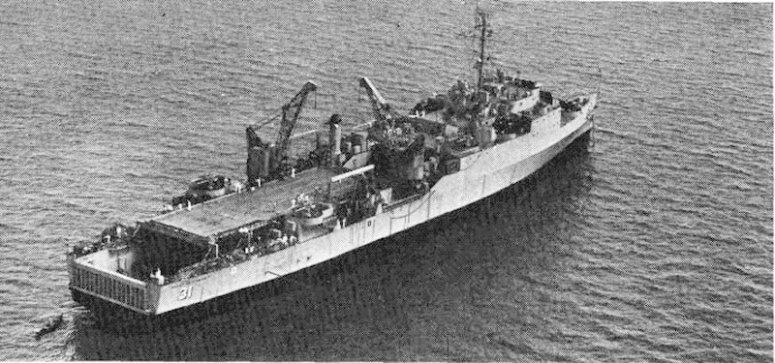
- USS Point Defiance (LSD-31)

History

United States
- Name: USS Point Defiance
- Namesake: Point Defiance
- Awarded: 28 February 1952
- Builder: Ingalls Shipbuilding, Pascagoula, Mississippi
- Laid down: 23 November 1953
- Launched: 28 September 1954
- Commissioned: 31 March 1955
- Decommissioned: 30 September 1983
- Stricken: 24 February 1992
- Honors and awards: 10 campaign stars (Vietnam)
- Fate: Scrapped October 2011

General characteristics
- Class & type: Thomaston-class dock landing ship
- Displacement: 8,899 long tons (9,042 t) light; 11,525 long tons (11,710 t) full load
- Length: 510 ft (160 m)
- Beam: 84 ft (26 m)
- Draft: 19 ft (5.8 m)
- Propulsion: 2 × steam turbines, 2 shafts, 23,000 shp (17 MW)
- Speed: 21 knots (39 km/h; 24 mph)
- Boats & landing craft carried: 21 × LCM-6 landing craft in well deck
- Troops: 300
- Complement: 304
- Armament: 4 × twin 3 in (76 mm)/50 cal guns; 6 × twin 20 mm AA guns
- Aircraft carried: One helicopter
- Aviation facilities: Helicopter landing area usually of wood construction; no hangar

USS Point Defiance (LSD-31) was a Thomaston-class dock landing ship of the United States Navy. She was named for Point Defiance, a location in Pierce County, Washington, the site of a military reservation established by the U.S. Government in 1866. She was the second ship assigned that name. The construction of the first ship, Casa Grande-class dock landing ship Point Defiance (LSD-23), was canceled on 17 August 1945.

Point Defiance (LSD–31) was laid down on 23 November 1953 by Ingalls Shipbuilding Corp., Pascagoula, Miss.; launched on 28 September 1954, sponsored by Mrs. Arthur D. Struble; and commissioned on 31 March 1955.

== Service history ==
=== 1955–1962 ===
Following shakedown in the Gulf of Mexico, the new dock landing ship arrived Long Beach, California, in July 1955 and joined Amphibious Squadron 7, Amphibious Force, Pacific Fleet.

After two deployments to the western Pacific, Point Defiance became one of the first rocket-launching surface ships to support the 1958 International Geophysical Year Solar Eclipse Expedition to the South Pacific. Launchers on deck fired eight Nike-Asp sounding rockets to collect scientific data during the eclipse.

In May 1959 Point Defiance participated in the large scale and highly successful amphibious "Operation Twin Peaks" off Oceanside, California In February 1960 Point Defiance made her third cruise to the western Pacific, participating in "Operation Blue Star", a combined amphibious operation with Chinese Nationalist Forces. In June 1960 she participated in "Operation Sea Hawk", a combined amphibious landing with Republic of Korea forces and returned to Long Beach in July.

She operated off the West Coast during most of 1961, and made a brief cruise to Pearl Harbor and Okinawa. Point Defiance departed Long Beach for the western Pacific in January 1962. In May she landed Marines at Bangkok, Thailand. In October she transited the Panama Canal and steamed to the Caribbean ready to act if needed during the Cuban Quarantine.

=== 1963–2011 ===
In early 1963 Point Defiance carried bathyscaphe Trieste from San Diego through the Panama Canal to Boston for deep search operations into the cause of the loss of the nuclear submarine Thresher (SSN-593).

In September Point Defiance was on her way to the western Pacific again. In October she steamed to Vietnam to safeguard U.S. interests, and in November participated in another combined amphibious operation with the Republic of China.

From April to September 1964, Point Defiance operated in the eastern Pacific, then underwent overhaul. She departed for the western Pacific on 27 April 1965 and off-loaded men and equipment at Da Nang, South Vietnam, on 26 May. On 18 June she helped rescue survivors from the midair collision of two Guam-based B-52s. In July she landed Marines at Qui Nhơn, South Vietnam, and in early August helped salvage USS Frank Knox, aground on Pratas Reef. In late August she took part in Operation Starlite, an amphibious raid at Van Tuong, South Vietnam, which inflicted heavy enemy casualties. After another successful amphibious landing, she returned home on 24 November.

Point Defiance again departed for the western Pacific on 27 March 1966, and began transporting troops and equipment from U.S. bases in the Far East to South Vietnam. She returned to Long Beach on 24 June, but deployed to South Vietnam again on 1 November. On 11 January 1967 Point Defiance participated in "Deckhouse V", a major U.S. operation in the Kien Hoa area. On 18 May she sent U.S. Marines on to the beach in the southern half of the Demilitarized Zone, exchanging fire with North Vietnamese shore batteries. She returned to Long Beach on 24 June.

On 7 May 1968 Point Defiance was off on another deployment to the western Pacific, once again with an amphibious ready group off Vietnam. She returned to Long Beach on 18 December.

In the summer of 1969, "Point Defiance" carried a contingent of Naval Academy Midshipmen from San Diego to Seattle to Honolulu and back to San Diego.

In 1972 the Point Defiance was again part of a Ready Group off the coast of Vietnam. It was part of a helicopter assault behind People's Army of Vietnam lines off the coast of northern South Vietnam in the area of Huế during the Easter Offensive of 1972.

[1968-2011]

=== Decommissioning, 1983–2011 ===
Point Defiance was decommissioned on 30 September 1983 and her name struck from the Naval Vessel Register on 24 February 1992. She was sold to Pegasus Inc., on 29 September 1995, but repossessed by the Navy, 1 July 1997. Custody was transferred to Maritime Administration (MARAD), 18 December 1998, and she was laid up in the National Defense Reserve Fleet, Suisun Bay, Benicia, California. On 28 July 2011, Point Defiance was sold by MARAD to All Star Metals of Brownsville, Tx for $578,539 to be dismantled. Point Defiance departed the Suisun Bay Reserve Fleet on 8 September to be cleaned by Allied Defense Recycling at the former Mare Island Naval Shipyard. Point Defiance was towed to Brownsville upon completion of the cleaning and was scrapped in October 2011.
