= USNS Point Barrow =

Decommissioned Cargo Ship Dock of the US Navy

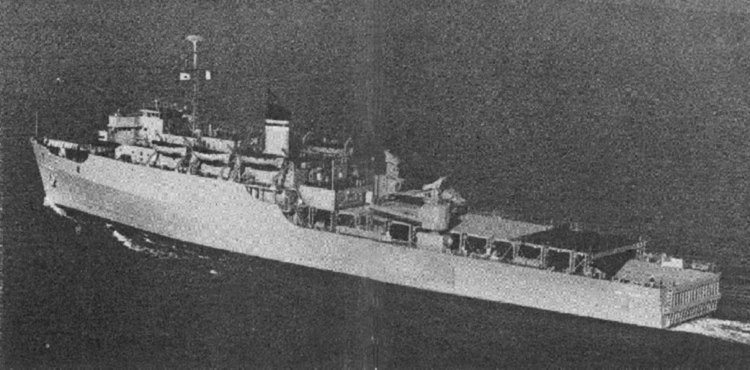
- USNS Point Barrow (T-AKD-1) underway, date and place unknown.

History

United States
- Namesake: Point Barrow, Alaska
- Builder: Maryland Drydock and Shipbuilding Company
- Yard number: Maritime Administration contract hull number 43
- Laid down: 18 September 1956
- Launched: 25 May 1957
- Decommissioned: 28 November 1991
- Renamed: USS Point Loma (AGDS-2) circa 1974
- Reclassified: Deep Submergence Support Ship cira 1974
- Refit: June 1965
- Stricken: 28 September 1993
- Identification: IMO number: 8835580
- Fate: Scrapping completed by Marine Metal Inc, Brownsville, TX. on 27 October 2006

General characteristics
- Class & type: Cargo ship dock
- Displacement: 10,320 tons (full)
- Length: 456 ft 6 in
- Beam: 74 ft 2 in
- Draft: 19 ft 4 in
- Propulsion: Two steam turbines; Two propellers
- Speed: 15.3 kts
- Complement: 67

USNS Point Barrow (T-AKD-1) was a one-of-a-kind "Cargo Ship Dock." She was the lone ship in her class, named for Point Barrow (the northernmost point in Alaska).

Point Barrow was laid down 18 September 1956 by Maryland Drydock and Shipbuilding Company of Baltimore; launched 25 May 1957; sponsored by Mrs. Ruthven E. Libbey; and delivered to the Military Sea Transportation Service (MSTS) 28 May 1958, where she was placed in service the following day. Especially designed for Arctic operations, Point Barrow was constructed along the general lines of a landing ship dock, but with strengthened hull and bow, and special insulation. After providing logistic support for U.S. forces in the Arctic, in 1962, Point Barrow transported huge fixed array radar antennas for the USS Enterprise and USS Long Beach to the East Coast.

After extensive modification in June 1965, Point Barrow carried Saturn rocket parts and stages from California to the Kennedy Space Center for NASA’s Apollo space flight program. T–AKD–1 also ferried LCMs to Southeast Asia in 1968 and 1969. Reclassified a "Deep Submergence Support Ship" and renamed USS Point Loma (AGDS-2) circa 1974, she was ultimately placed out of service and struck from the Naval Vessel Register 28 September 1993. Custody was transferred to the Maritime Administration for lay up in the National Defense Reserve Fleet at Suisun Bay in Benicia, California. Point Loma was scrapped by Marine Metal Inc. of Brownsville, Texas, on 27 October 2006.
