= Operation Steel Pike =

Operation Steel Pike was the largest peacetime amphibious landing exercise in history, conducted by the United States Navy and Marine Corps and taking place on the coast of Spain in October to November 1964.

The operation involved 84 naval ships and 28,000 Marines of the 2nd Marine Division, and was commanded by Vice Admiral John S. McCain, Jr. and Lieutenant general James P. Berkeley. The director of the control group for the exercise was Brigadier general John C. Miller Jr. In the opening hour of the landing, two helicopters collided in mid-air, resulting in the deaths of nine Marines and causing injuries to 13 others. Another Marine was crushed to death by a tank while asleep in his sleeping bag. During the trip over the ships were divided into three convoys sailing under war time conditions with ASW escorts. There were many civilian ships contracted to the Navy to transport military personnel and cargo to the landing area. Once the ships were anchored in place the landings began. There were two or three days of landing men and equipment ashore, then one day of rest for the landing craft. After that, the task force started back loading men and equipment onto the ships. When it was finished, the ships departed for liberty to different ports: the USS Okinawa to La Pallice and La Rochelle, France, and to Plymouth, England.

Additional notes by a Marine veteran of the operation: The units, including both ground and aviation conducted joint wargame exercises with NATO allies in Spain. During the deployment the Marines were visited by Commandant of the Marines Corps, General Wallace M. Greene. The Gen RM Blatchford took Marines to liberty call in the Canary Islands.
