= Dock landing ship =

Type of amphibious warfare ship

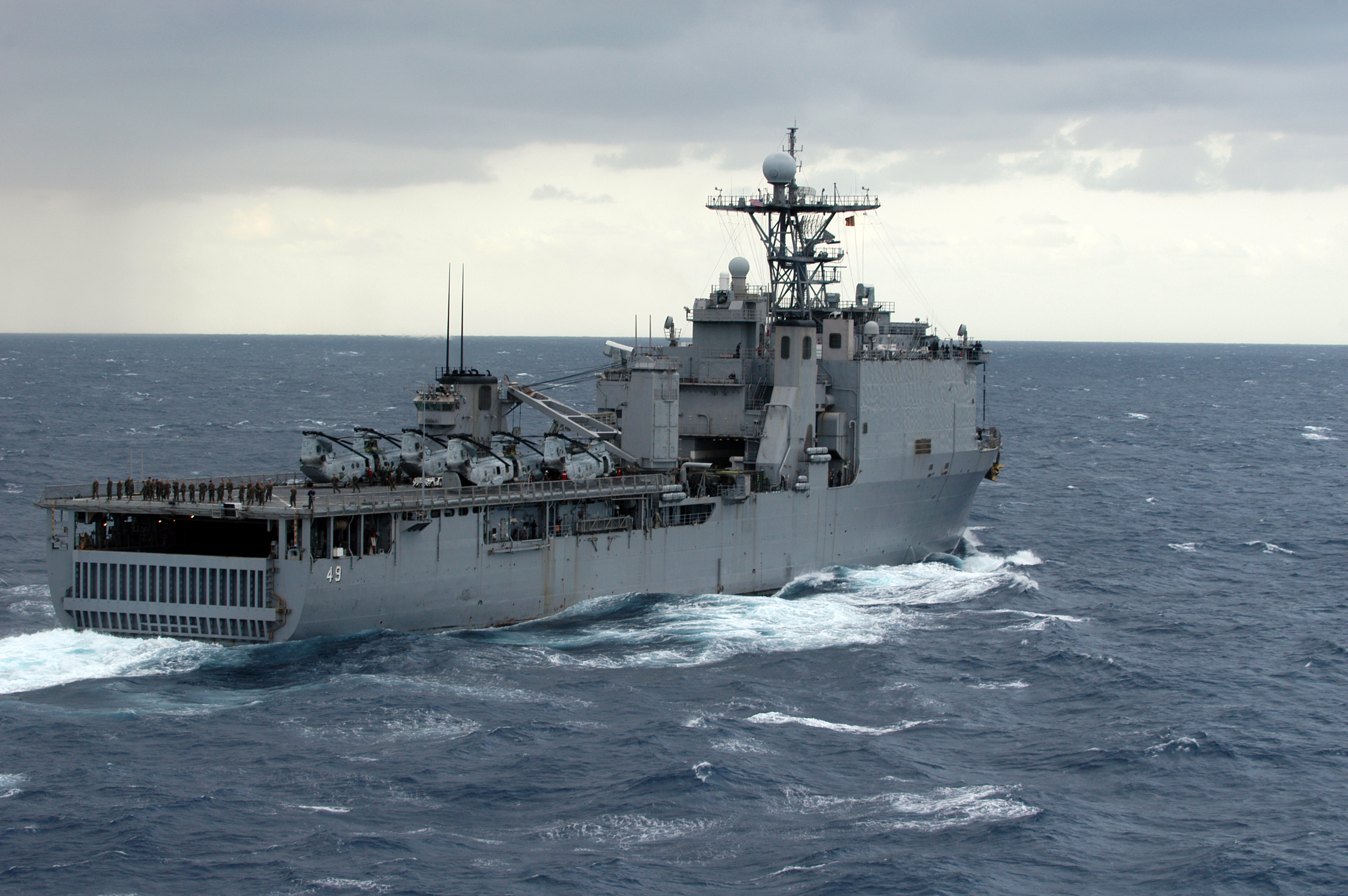
USS Harpers Ferry, a United States Navy dock landing ship

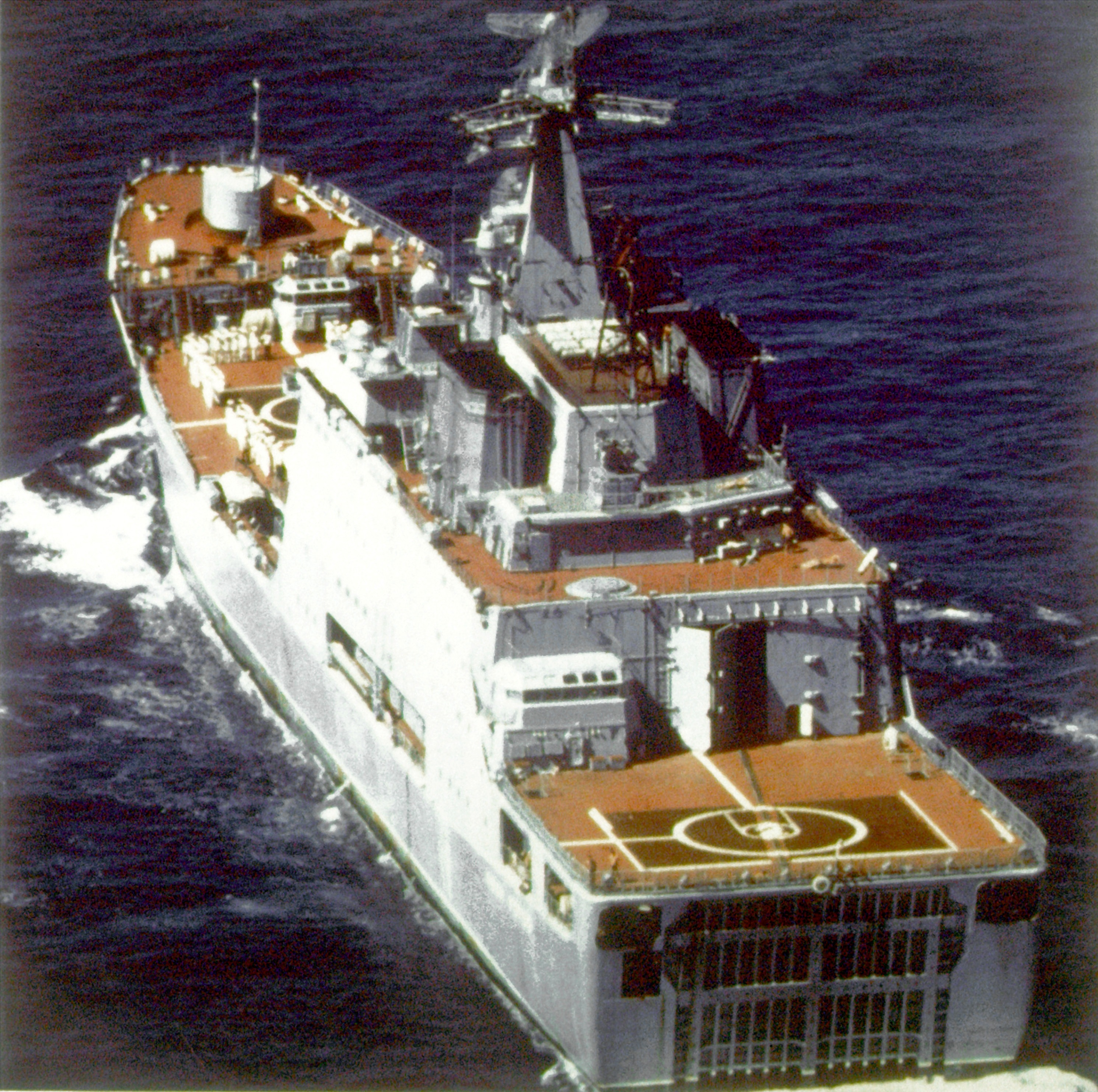
Soviet Ivan Rogov-class landing ship

A dock landing ship (also called landing ship, dock or LSD) is an amphibious warfare ship with a well dock to transport and launch landing craft and amphibious vehicles. Some ships with well decks, such as the Soviet Ivan Rogov class, also have bow doors to enable them to deliver vehicles directly onto a beach (like a tank landing ship). Modern dock landing ships also operate helicopters.

A ship with a well deck (docking well) can transfer cargo to landing craft in rougher seas far more easily than a ship which has to use cranes or a stern ramp. The U.S. Navy hull classification symbol for a ship with a well deck depends on its facilities for aircraft—a (modern) LSD has a helicopter deck, a landing platform dock also has a hangar, and a landing helicopter dock or landing helicopter assault has a full-length flight deck.

== History ==
The LSD (U.S. Navy hull classification for landing ship, dock) came as a result of a British requirement during the Second World War for a vessel that could carry large landing craft across the seas at speed. The predecessor of all modern LSDs is Shinshū Maru of the Imperial Japanese Army, which could launch her infantry landing craft using an internal rail system and a stern ramp. She entered service in 1935 and saw combat in China and during the initial phase of Japanese offenses during 1942.

The first LSD of the Royal Navy came from a design by Sir Roland Baker who had designed the British landing craft tank. It was an answer to the problem of launching small craft rapidly. The landing ship stern chute, which was a converted train ferry (Train Ferry No. 1 which had been built for British Army use in the First World War), was an early attempt. Thirteen landing craft mechanized (LCM) could be launched from these ships down the chute. The landing ship gantry was a converted tanker with a crane to transfer its cargo of landing craft from deck to sea—15 LCM in a little over half an hour.

The design was developed and built in the U.S. for the U.S. Navy and the Royal Navy. The LSD could carry 36 LCM at 16 knots (30 km/h). It took one and a half hours for the dock to be flooded down and two and half to pump it out. When flooded they could also be used as docks for repairs to small craft. Smaller landing craft could be carried in the hold as could full-tracked and wheeled amphibious assault or support vehicles.

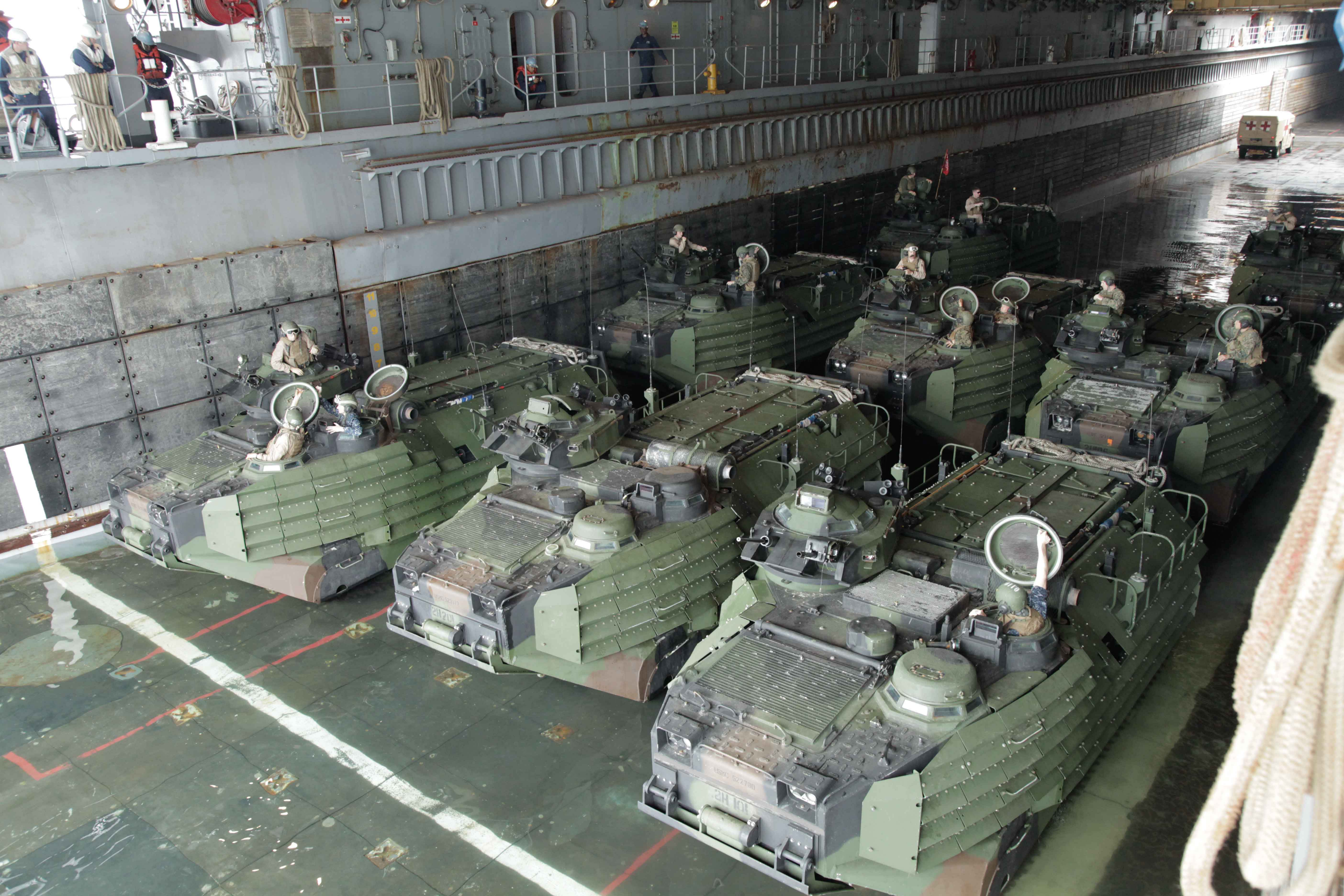
Amphibious vehicles inside a US LSD

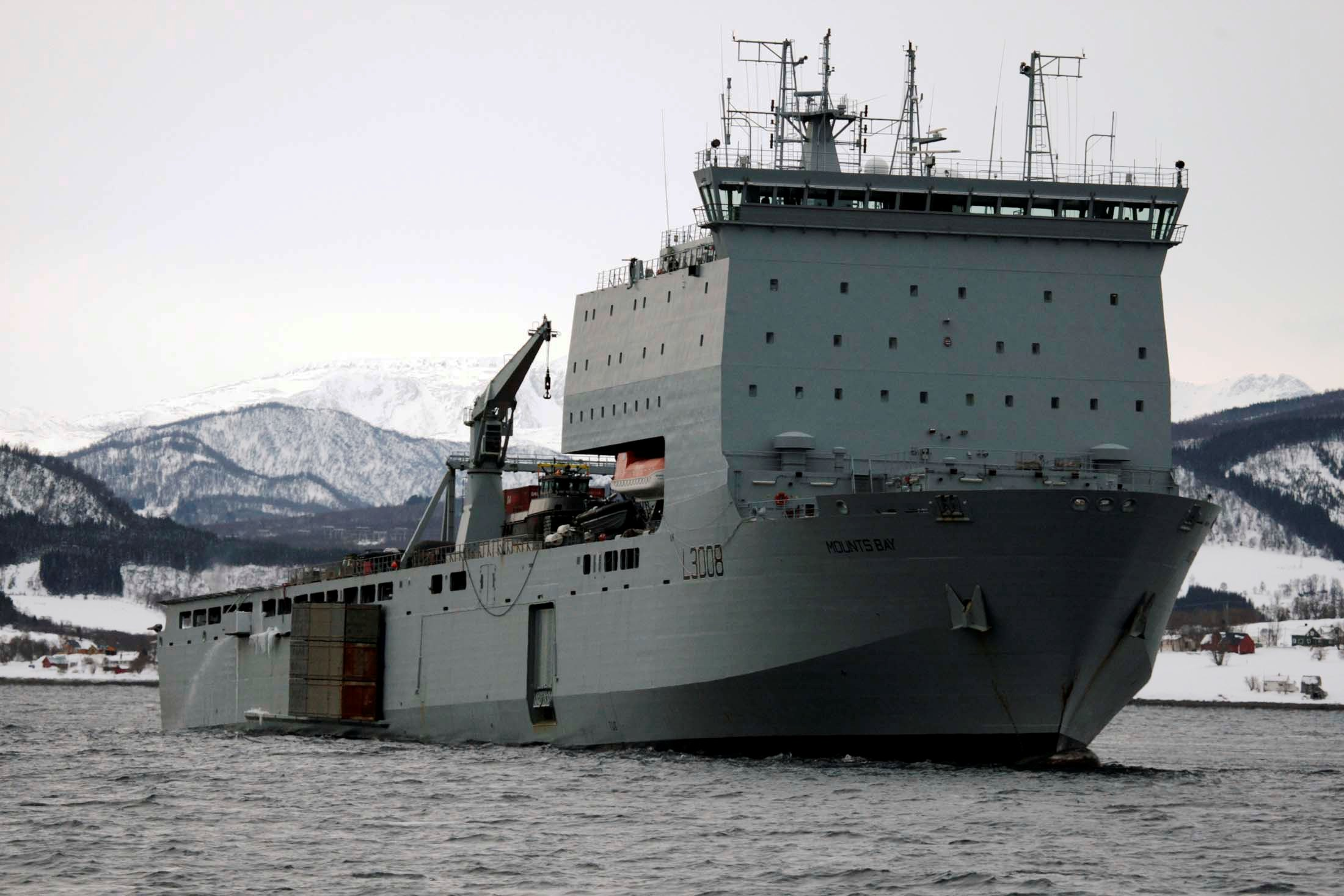
A British Bay-class landing ship

== Vessels ==
In the U.S. Navy, two related groups of vessels classified as LSDs are in service as of 2023, the Whidbey Island and Harpers Ferry classes, mainly used to carry hovercraft (LCACs), operate helicopters, and carry Marines.

The British Royal Fleet Auxiliary (RFA) operates three Bay-class landing ships based on the Dutch-Spanish Enforcer design in support of the Royal Navy's operations, while a fourth ship of the class—previously in RFA service—is now operated by the Royal Australian Navy.

Former U.S. LSDs include the Ashland class, Casa Grande class, Thomaston class, and Anchorage class.

== LSD classes ==
=== In service ===
Country	Class	In service	Commissioned	Length	Beam	Draft	Displacement (mt)	Note	Image
Australia	Choules (L-100)	1	2011	176.6 m (579 ft)	26.4 m (87 ft)	5.8 m (19 ft)	17,810	Ex-RFA Largs Bay (L3006) sold to Royal Australian Navy in April 2011.	
Taiwan	Hsu Hai (LSD-193)	1	2000	169 m (554 ft)	26.0 m (85.3 ft)	6.1 m (20 ft)	14,225	Ex-USS Pensacola (LSD-38) sold to Republic of China (Taiwan) Navy in 2000.	
United Kingdom	Bay	3	2007	176.6 m (579 ft)	26.4 m (87 ft)	5.8 m (19 ft)	17,810		
United States	Whidbey Island	6	1985	186 m (610 ft)	26.0 m (85.3 ft)	5.94 m (19.5 ft)	16,100		
United States	Harpers Ferry	4	1995	185.80 m (609.6 ft)	26.0 m (85.3 ft)	5.94 m (19.5 ft)	19,600		

=== Decommissioned ===
Country	Class	Out of service	Commissioned	Length	Beam	Draft	Displacement (mt)	Note	Image
Argentina	Cándido de Lasala (Q-43)	1	1970–1981	139.5 m (458 ft)	22.0 m (72.2 ft)	4.83 m (15.8 ft)	7,930	Ex-USS Gunston Hall (LSD-5) sold to Argentina in 1970, scrapped after 1981.	
Brazil	Ceará (G-30), Rio de Janeiro (G-31)	2	1990–2012	160 m (520 ft)	26.0 m (85.3 ft)	5.94 m (19.5 ft)	11,989	Ex-USS Hermitage (LSD-34) loaned in 1989 and later sold to Brazilian Navy, sunk as target 2021; ex-USS Alamo (LSD-33) loaned to Brazilian Navy in 1990, scrapped 2015 Turkey.	
Taiwan	Chung Cheng (LSD-191)	1	1977–1985	139.5 m (458 ft)	22.0 m (72.2 ft)	4.83 m (15.8 ft)	7,930	Ex-USS White Marsh (LSD-8) loaned to the ROC Navy in 1960, scrapped 1985.	
Taiwan	Chung Cheng (LSD-191)	1	1984–2012	139.5 m (458 ft)	22.0 m (72.2 ft)	4.83 m (15.8 ft)	7,930	Ex-USS Comstock (LSD-19) sold for scrapping 1984, salvaged by ROC Navy, sunk as artificial reef June 2015.	
Soviet Union	Ivan Rogov	3	1978–2002	157 m (515 ft)	23.8 m (78 ft)	6.7 m (22 ft)	14,060	Ivan Rogov and Aleksandr Nikolayev are now being preserved; Mitrofan Moskalenko auctioned off for scrapping in 2012.	
United States	Ashland	8	1943–1969	139.5 m (458 ft)	22.0 m (72.2 ft)	4.83 m (15.8 ft)	7,930	Ex-USS Gunston Hall (LSD-5) sold to Argentina; Ex-USS White Marsh (LSD-8) sold to Taiwan; rest scrapped from 1968 to 1970.	
United States	Casa Grande	13	1944–1970	139.5 m (458 ft)	22.0 m (72.2 ft)	4.83 m (15.8 ft)	7,930	Last ship ex-USS Shadwell (LSD-15) scrapped in 2017.	
United States	Thomaston	8	1954–1990	160 m (520 ft)	26.0 m (85.3 ft)	5.94 m (19.5 ft)	11,989	Ex-USS Alamo (LSD-33) loaned to Brazilian Navy; ex-USS Hermitage (LSD-34) loaned and later sold to Brazilian Navy; all other scrapped or sunk as target	
United States	Anchorage	5	1969–2003	169 m (554 ft)	26.0 m (85.3 ft)	6.1 m (20 ft)	14,225	Ex-USS Pensacola (LSD-38) sold to Republic of China (Taiwan) Navy and only active ship with all others scrapped or sunk as target.	
United States	Whidbey Island	2	1985–present	186 m (610 ft)	26.0 m (85.3 ft)	6.1 m (20 ft)	16,100	Whidbey Island and Fort McHenry in inactive reserve	

== See also ==
- List of amphibious warfare ships
- List of United States Navy amphibious warfare ships § Landing Ship Dock (LSD)
- Roll-on/roll-off
- USNS Point Barrow (T-AKD-1), a cargo ship of similar design

== Bibliography ==
- Brown, D. K. (November 2006). Nelson to Vanguard. Annapolis, Maryland: US Naval Institute Press. ISBN 1-59114-602-X.
