= State Reception Room =

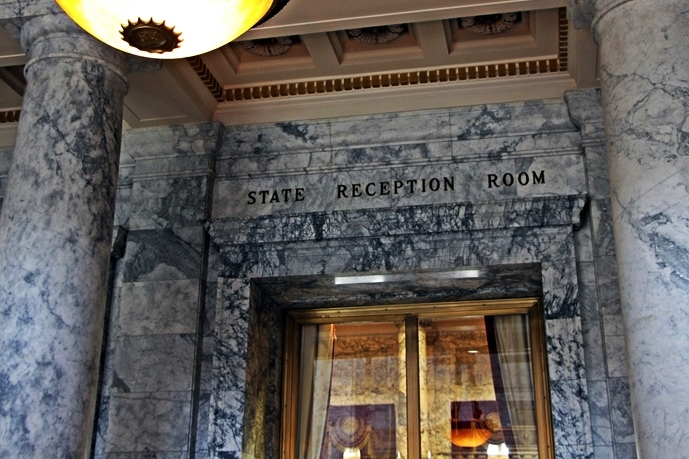
- Entrance to the State Reception Room
- Building: Washington State Capitol
- Location: Olympia, Washington, US
- Coordinates: 47°02′09″N 122°54′17″W
- Purpose: State occasions

The State Reception Room is a formal salon on the third floor of the Washington State Capitol in which foreign dignitaries and other official visitors are presented to, and received by, the Governor of Washington. It is notable for having what was once the world's largest single-loom carpet.

== History ==
The State Reception Room is an original space built during the 1928 construction of the Washington State Capitol. With a capacity of 211, it is primarily intended for use by the governor to receive dignitaries, but has also been used for other special events, including inaugural balls, the convening of the Washington delegation to the Electoral College, and addresses by state officials to constituent groups.

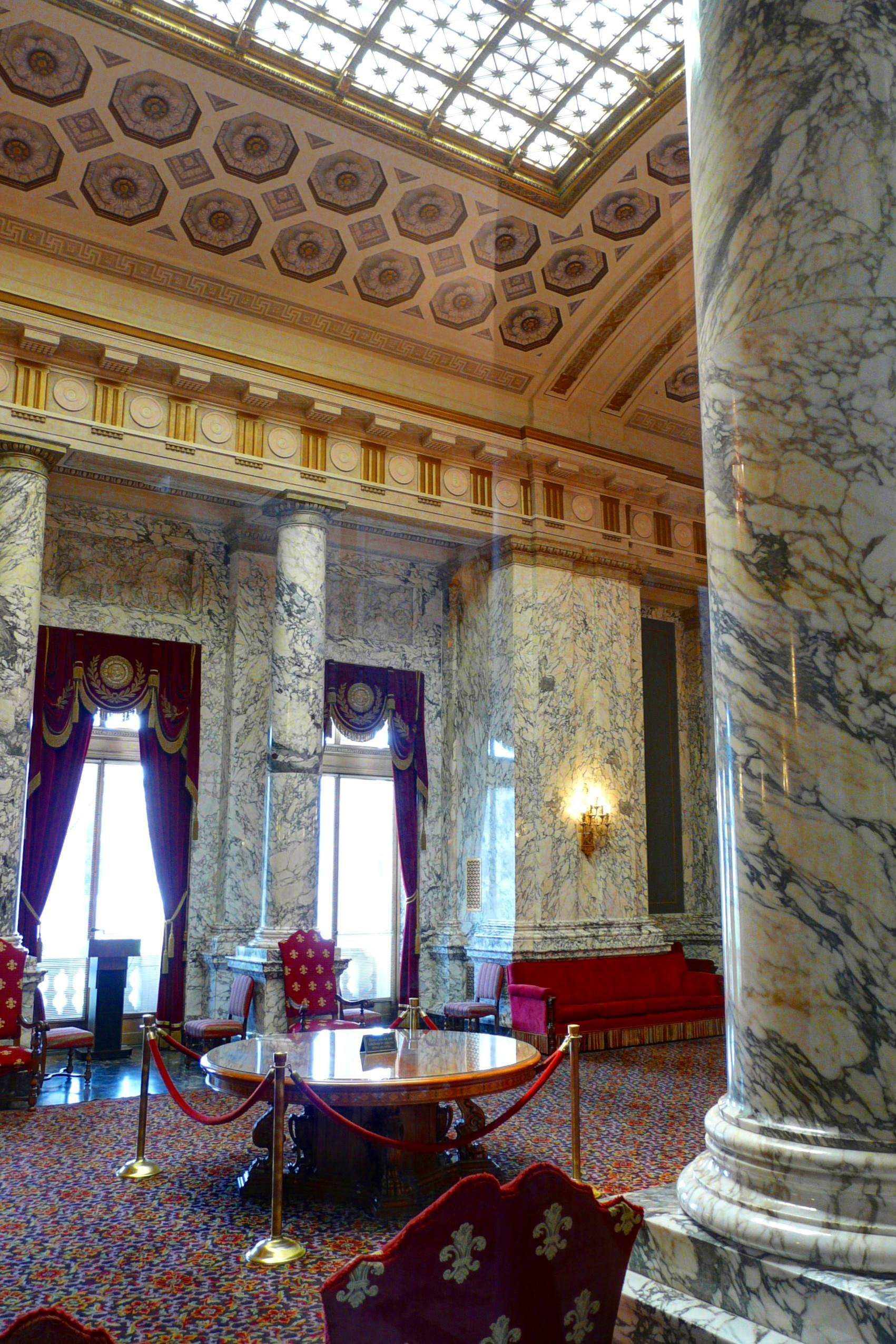
Interior of the State Reception Room, with Mohawk carpet, pictured in 2013

In 1985, the room was one of several areas in the Capitol that underwent "beautification" by enlivening the marble surfaces of its walls.

== Design ==
Situated between the upper-floor galleries of the chambers of the Senate and the House of Representatives, the State Reception Room is constructed from Bresche Violet marble imported from Italy and veined with the colors red, lavender, and green. It is illuminated by chandeliers manufactured by Tiffany & Co. in the former Czechoslovakia. The room's herringbone pattern teak floors are generally kept covered by a 1928 Mohawk carpet that was notable, at the time of its placement, for being the world's largest single-loom carpet. The carpet is removed for the governor's quadrennial inaugural ball. A fireplace is built into each end of the chamber.

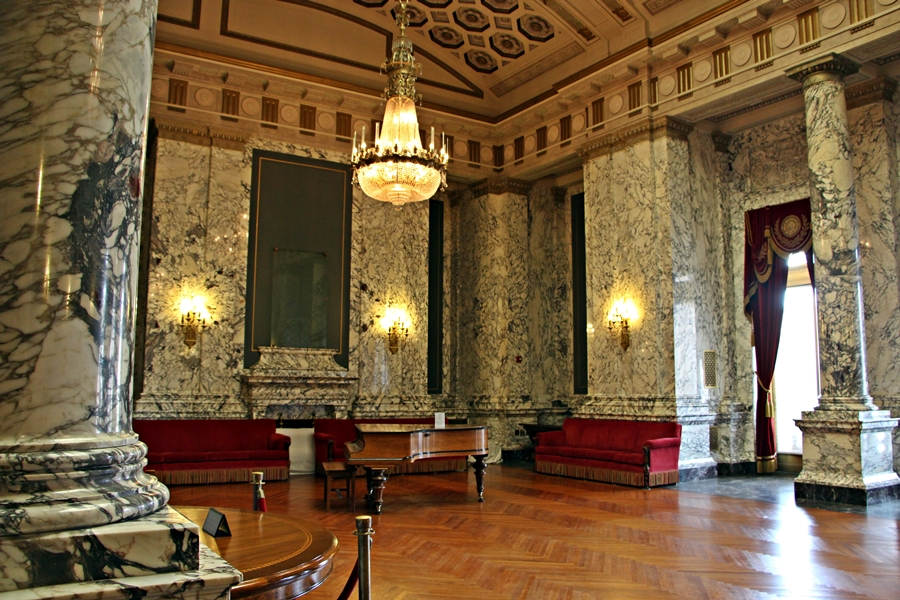
Interior of the State Reception Room, without Mohawk carpet, pictured in 2017

== Furnishings ==
As of 2017, the centerpiece of the room is an ornate, 7-foot (2.1 m), circular table with a base carved from the trunk of a single Circassian walnut tree in the shape of the legs of eagles. The table was a gift from architects Walter R. Wilder and Harry K. White, who designed the Capitol, to the State of Washington.

Over one of the room's two fireplaces, the first flag of Washington, sewn in 1916, is placed. Over the other fireplace is a 42-star United States flag – the design of the U.S. flag as it briefly existed during the year in which Washington was admitted to the Union, only seven of which were ever made officially.

Other furnishings in the State Reception Room were selected and acquired by W. & J. Sloane under a state contract. Drapery and window treatments were provided by Frederick & Nelson.

== See also ==
- Diplomatic Reception Rooms, U.S. Department of State
- State room
- Washington Governor's Mansion
