= Rhodes House (Tacoma) =

Historic house in Washington, United States

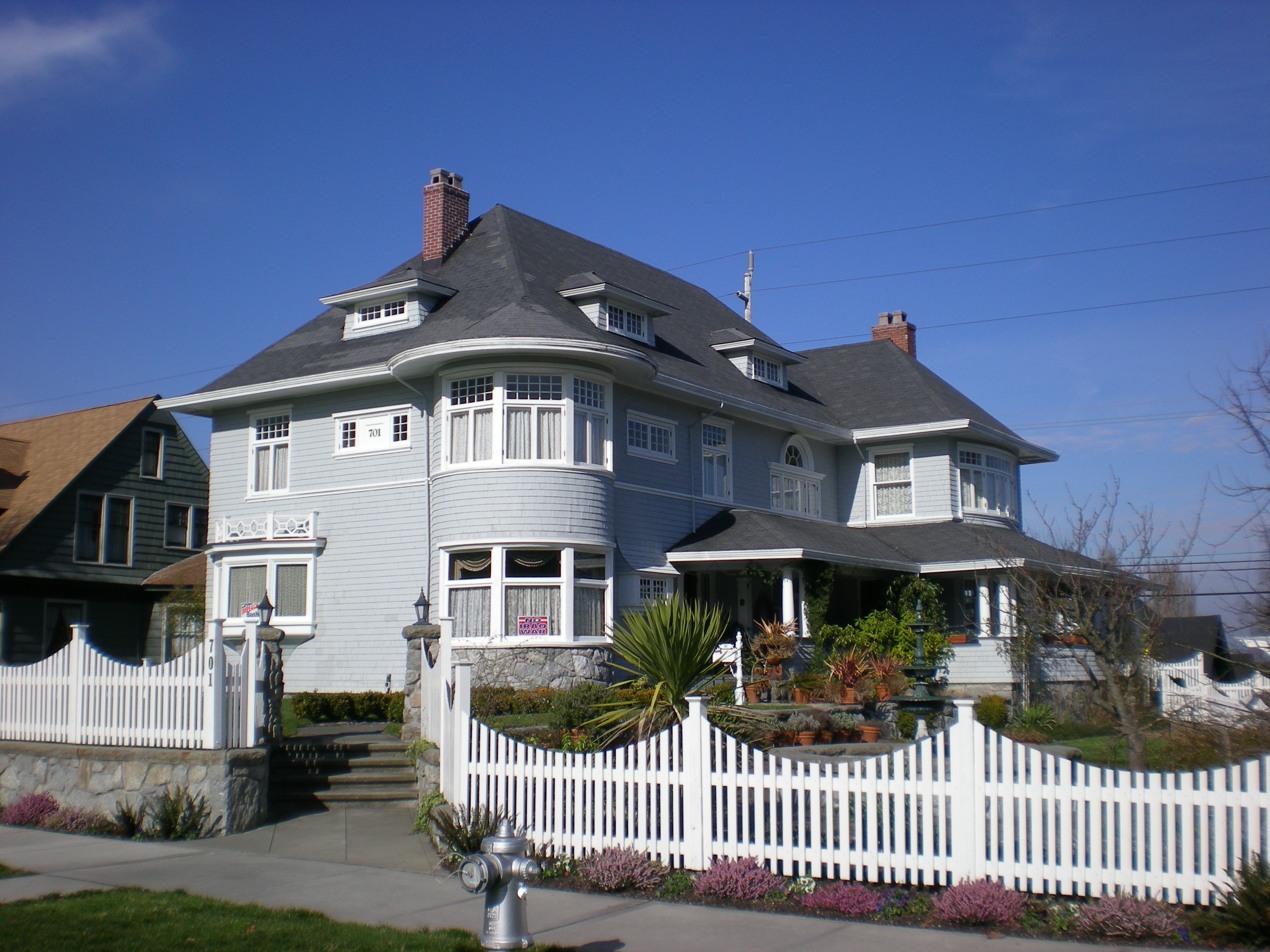
Henry A. and Birdella Rhodes House

The Rhodes House or Henry A. and Birdella Rhodes House is listed on the National Register of Historic Places. Henry Rhodes had Ambrose J. Russell and Frederick Heath design and build the house in 1901.

== See also ==
- Rhodes Brothers
- Rhodesleigh (another mansion)
