= William Rust =

William Rust may refer to:

- William Rust (journalist) (1903–1949), British communist activist and newspaper editor
- William A. Rust (1846–1903), Wisconsin state senator
- William Ross Rust, president of the Tacoma Smelter and Refining Company
- William Ross Rust House, named after William Ross Rust
- William Rust Summit, a mountain summit in California
