= Super J-Cup (2019) =

Super J-Cup: 7th Stage
- Promotion: New Japan Pro-Wrestling
- Date: August 22, 2019–August 25, 2019
- City: Night 1: Tacoma, Washington; Night 2: San Francisco, California; Night 3: Long Beach, California
- Venue: Night 1: Masonic Temple Building-Temple Theater; Night 3: San Francisco State University Student Life Events Center; Night 4: Walter Pyramid

Super J-Cup chronology
← Previous; 6th Stage	Next → 8th Stage

Super J-Cup: 7th Stage was the seventh Super J-Cup professional wrestling single-elimination tournament produced by New Japan Pro-Wrestling (NJPW). It was a three-night event taking place on August 22, 2019, August 24, 2019, and August 25, 2019. The first round took place on August 22 at the Masonic Temple Building-Temple Theater in Tacoma, Washington. The second round took place on August 24 at San Francisco State University's Student Life Events Center in San Francisco, California. The semi-finals and final took place on August 25 at Walter Pyramid in Long Beach, California. This was the first Super J-Cup tournament to be held outside Japan and contested in the United States. El Phantasmo won the tournament by defeating Dragon Lee in the tournament final.

== Production ==
=== Background ===
On June 10, 2019, Jushin Liger announced at a press conference in Tokyo that the Super J-Cup would be returning after a three-year hiatus and he would be producing the event. It was announced that the tournament would be held outside Japan for the first time as a three-night event in different venues in the United States as a global expansion of the event. The dates announced for the event were August 22, August 24 and August 25, 2019. The venues were revealed to be Masonic Temple Building-Temple Theater in Tacoma, Washington on August 22, San Francisco State University's Student Life Events Center in San Francisco, California on August 24 and Walter Pyramid in Long Beach, California on August 25.

=== Participants ===
NJPW revealed the lineup of the 2019 Super J-Cup between July 26 and August 13, with the first round match between Amazing Red and Will Ospreay, billed as a "dream match" scheduled to headline the first night of Super J-Cup on August 22.

Name:	Promotion:	Group:	Championship held:
Amazing Red	New Japan Pro-Wrestling		–
Bushi	New Japan Pro-Wrestling	Los Ingobernables de Japon	–
Carístico	Consejo Mundial de Lucha Libre		NWA World Historic Middleweight Championship
Clark Connors	New Japan Pro-Wrestling		–
Dragon Lee	Consejo Mundial de Lucha Libre		CMLL World Welterweight Championship
El Phantasmo	New Japan Pro-Wrestling	Bullet Club	IWGP Junior Heavyweight Tag Team Championship; RPW British Cruiserweight Championship
Jonathan Gresham	Ring of Honor		–
Robbie Eagles	New Japan Pro-Wrestling	Chaos	–
Rocky Romero	New Japan Pro-Wrestling	Chaos	–
Ryusuke Taguchi	New Japan Pro-Wrestling	Taguchi Japan	NEVER Openweight 6-Man Tag Team Championship
Soberano Jr.	Consejo Mundial de Lucha Libre		Mexican National Welterweight Championship
Sho	New Japan Pro-Wrestling	Roppongi 3K/Chaos	–
Taiji Ishimori	New Japan Pro-Wrestling	Bullet Club	IWGP Junior Heavyweight Tag Team Championship
TJP	New Japan Pro-Wrestling		–
Yoh	New Japan Pro-Wrestling	Roppongi 3K/Chaos	–
Will Ospreay	New Japan Pro-Wrestling		IWGP Junior Heavyweight Championship

=== Non-tournament matches ===
Aside from the tournament, Jushin Liger, who had planned to retire at Wrestle Kingdom 14, would not be entering the Super J-Cup but would be participating in non-tournament matches throughout the three-night event.

== Results ==
Night 1 (August 22)
No.	Results	Stipulations	Times
1	Jushin Liger and Karl Fredericks defeated Ren Narita and Shota Umino	Tag team match	7:30
2	Soberano Jr. defeated Rocky Romero	2019 Super J-Cup first round	11:04
3	TJP defeated Clark Connors	2019 Super J-Cup first round	11:56
4	Carístico defeated Bushi	2019 Super J-Cup first round	10:08
5	Ryusuke Taguchi defeated Jonathan Gresham	2019 Super J-Cup first round	12:59
6	El Phantasmo defeated Robbie Eagles	2019 Super J-Cup first round	12:17
7	Dragon Lee defeated Yoh	2019 Super J-Cup first round	18:51
8	Sho defeated Taiji Ishimori	2019 Super J-Cup first round	17:06
9	Will Ospreay defeated Amazing Red	2019 Super J-Cup first round	28:19

Night 2 (August 24)
No.	Results	Stipulations	Times
1	Jonathan Gresham defeated Alex Coughlin	Singles match	8:14
2	Robbie Eagles defeated Clark Connors	Singles match	9:12
3	Bushi defeated Shota Umino	Singles match	7:06
4	Bullet Club (Gedo and Taiji Ishimori) defeated Karl Fredericks and Ren Narita	Tag team match	8:39
5	Amazing Red and Jushin Liger defeated Chaos (Rocky Romero and Yoh)	Tag team match	12:51
6	Carístico defeated Soberano Jr.	2019 Super J-Cup quarter-final round	8:30
7	El Phantasmo defeated TJP	2019 Super J-Cup quarter-final round	14:49
8	Dragon Lee defeated Ryusuke Taguchi	2019 Super J-Cup quarter-final round	11:37
9	Will Ospreay defeated Sho	2019 Super J-Cup quarter-final round	30:32

Night 3 (August 25)
No.	Results	Stipulations	Times
1	Dragon Lee defeated Carístico	2019 Super J-Cup semi-final round	11:10
2	El Phantasmo defeated Will Ospreay	2019 Super J-Cup semi-final round	11:25
3	Alex Coughlin defeated Shota Umino	Singles match	7:34
4	Jonathan Gresham defeated Clark Connors by referee's decision	Singles match	10:25
5	Soberano Jr. defeated Ren Narita	Singles match	6:55
6	Juice Robinson defeated Karl Fredericks	Singles match	9:55
7	Amazing Red, Jushin Liger, Ryusuke Taguchi and TJP defeated Chaos (Robbie Eagles, Rocky Romero, and Roppongi 3K (Sho and Yoh))	Eight-man tag team match	14:17
8	Bullet Club (Jay White and Taiji Ishimori) defeated Los Ingobernables de Japon (Bushi and Tetsuya Naito)	Tag team match	14:09
9	El Phantasmo defeated Dragon Lee	2019 Super J-Cup tournament final	25:33

=== Tournament brackets ===
First Round
Will Ospreay	Pin
Amazing Red	28:19
Sho	Pin
Taiji Ishimori	17:06
Clark Connors	11:56
TJP	Sub
Robbie Eagles	12:17
El Phantasmo	Pin
Ryusuke Taguchi	Pin
Jonathan Gresham	12:59
Yoh	18:51
Dragon Lee	Pin
Carístico	Pin
Bushi	10:08
Rocky Romero	11:04
Soberano Jr.	Pin

Quarter-Finals
Will Ospreay	Pin
Sho	30:32
TJP	14:49
El Phantasmo	Pin
Ryusuke Taguchi	Pin
Dragon Lee	11:37
Carístico	Pin
Soberano Jr.	8:30

Semi-Finals
Will Ospreay	11:25
El Phantasmo	Pin
Dragon Lee	Pin
Carístico	11:10

Final
El Phantasmo	Pin
Dragon Lee	25:33
