= USS White Marsh =

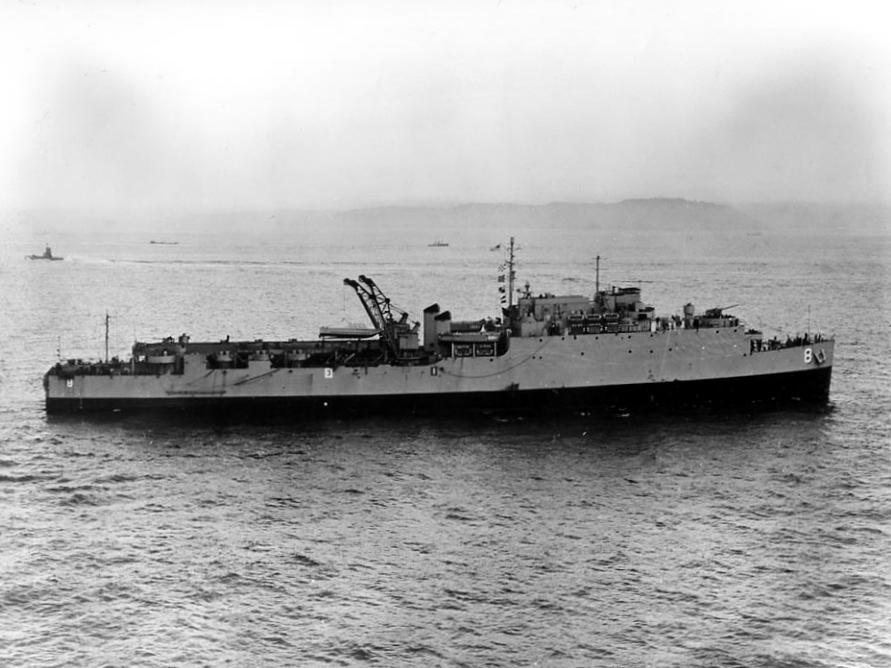
- USS White Marsh (LSD-8) at sea in the 1950s

History

United States
- Name: USS White Marsh
- Namesake: White Marsh, Virginia
- Builder: Moore Dry Dock Company
- Laid down: 7 April 1943
- Launched: 19 July 1943
- Commissioned: 29 January 1944
- Decommissioned: September 1956
- In service: September 1956
- Out of service: November 1960
- Fate: Transferred to Taiwan, November 1960
- Stricken: 15 April 1976

Taiwan
- Name: ROCS Chung Cheng (LSD-191)
- Acquired: November 1960
- Fate: Sold for scrap, 1984

General characteristics
- Class & type: Ashland-class dock landing ship
- Displacement: 7,930 tons (loaded), 4,032 tons (light draft)
- Length: 457 ft 9 in (139.5 m) overall
- Beam: 72 ft 2 in (22.0 m)
- Draft: 8 ft 2½ in (2.5 m) fwd, 10 ft ½ in (3.1 m) aft (light); 15 ft 5½ in (4.7 m) fwd, 16 ft 2 in (4.9 m) aft (loaded)
- Propulsion: 2 Babcock & Wilcox boilers, 2 Skinner Uniflow Reciprocating Steam Engines, 2 propeller shafts – each shaft 3,700 hp, at 240 rpm total shaft horse power 7,400, 2 11 ft 9 in diameter, 9 ft 9 in pitch propellers
- Speed: 17 knots (31 km/h)
- Range: 8,000 nmi. at 15 knots; (15,000 km at 28 km/h)
- Boats & landing craft carried: 3 × LCT (Mk V or VI); each w/ 5 medium tanks or; 2 × LCT (Mk III or IV); each w/ 12 medium tanks or; 14 × LCM (Mk III); each w/ 1 medium tank; or 1,500 long tons cargo or; 47 × DUKW or; 41 × LVT or; Any combination of landing vehicles and landing craft up to capacity
- Capacity: 22 officers, 218 men
- Complement: 17 officers, 237 men (ship); 6 officers, 30 men (landing craft)
- Armament: 1 × 5 in / 38 cal. DP gun; 2 × 40 mm quad AA guns; 2 × 40 mm twin AA guns; 16 × 20 mm AA guns
- Aircraft carried: modified to accommodate helicopters on an added portable deck

USS White Marsh (LSD-8) was an Ashland-class dock landing ship of the United States Navy, named in honor of White Marsh, Virginia, the birthplace of Walter Reed (1851–1902).

White Marsh was laid down on 7 April 1943 at Oakland, California, by the Moore Dry Dock Company; launched on 19 July 1943, sponsored by Mrs. William C. Wise, the wife of Col. Wise, USMC; and commissioned on 29 January 1944.

== World War II ==
After commissioning, the dock landing ship made two voyages from San Francisco to Morro Bay, where she delivered two cargoes of LCMs to the boat basin located there before heading to San Diego for shakedown. She completed that training and returned to San Francisco on 15 March. On the 23d, the ship got underway for Hawaii with a load of landing craft and passengers. She arrived at Oahu on 30 March and reported for duty with the 5th Amphibious Force, Pacific Fleet. She made a round-trip voyage to San Francisco and back to Pearl Harbor between 31 March and 15 April. From then until late in May, she conducted amphibious exercises in preparation for the Marianas campaign.

=== Central Pacific ===
On the 29th, White Marsh departed Pearl Harbor in company with Task Group 52.15 (TG 52.15), bound for Saipan. After a stop at Eniwetok en route, she and her task unit arrived in the Marianas before dawn of 15 June. Later that morning, White Marsh and her companion ships disembarked troops of the 2nd and 4th Marine Divisions and the landing went forward. Following the initial assault on Saipan, the dock landing ship settled into a routine of repair duties for damaged landing craft for a week before departing the Marianas to return to the United States.

After a stop at Pearl Harbor en route, the ship entered San Francisco on 11 July. Following voyage repairs, she loaded cargo and passengers; got underway for Hawaii; arrived back in Oahu on 28 July; and remained there until 12 August, preparing for the invasion of the Palau Islands. She loaded tanks and embarked troops of the Army's 710th Tank Battalion and departed Pearl Harbor on 12 August in company with TG 23.4. Staged through Guadalcanal where she participated in amphibious rehearsals, White Marsh arrived off Angaur on 16 September and, after disembarking the 710th Tank Battalion, again started repair work on damaged landing craft. On 21 September, she left the Palaus on her way to the Western Caroline Islands. Following the occupation of Ulithi Atoll, from 23 to 25 September, she departed that atoll and proceeded to New Guinea.

She arrived at Hollandia on 28 September and reported for duty with the 7th Amphibious Force. The next day, she returned to sea, bound for Finschhafen, located farther down the northern coast of New Guinea opposite the island of New Britain. The ship embarked troops, loaded cargo at Finschhafen, resumed her voyage, and arrived at Manus Island on 2 October. There, she prepared for her third amphibious landing of the war, the invasion of the Philippines.

=== Philippines ===
On the 12th, she departed Manus as a unit of TG 78.2 and set a course for San Pedro Bay, Leyte. White Marsh disembarked her troops and unloaded her cargo there on 20 October, the day of the initial landings on Leyte, and departed the island that same afternoon, bound for New Guinea. The dock landing ship reached Hollandia on 24 October, loaded troops, and then steamed to Biak Island on the 29th. At Biak, she took on additional soldiers and some cargo before heading back to the Philippines on the 31st. She arrived at Dulag, Leyte, on 5 November, disembarked her passengers, unloaded cargo, and departed the island on the 6th.

During November and December, White Marsh continued to make reinforcement and resupply voyages between New Guinea and Leyte to support the campaign to liberate the southern Philippines. That routine ended late in December when she arrived at Aitape, New Guinea, to prepare for the invasion of Luzon.

She departed Aitape on 28 December, bound for northern Luzon in company with a unit of TG 78.1. She arrived off Lingayen on the night of 8 and 9 January and, the following morning, unloaded troops and cargo for the assault. She then served briefly again as a landing craft repair ship but departed Lingayen Gulf on the 10th. En route to Leyte, White Marsh's unit suffered a kamikaze attack which resulted in severe damage and considerable casualties on board Du Page.

The dock landing ship, however, arrived unscathed at Leyte on 13 January, but soon returned to sea as an element of TG 78.2, bound for Wakde Island. She arrived there on 17 January and loaded Luzon-bound troops and equipment. She departed Wakde on the 19th and set a course for Lingayen. En route, her unit again came under aerial attack when a single Nakajima B5N "Kate" torpedo bomber succeeded in torpedoing Shadwell. During the attack, White Marsh's antiaircraft battery joined those of her colleagues and brought down the enemy aviator. She arrived back in Lingayen Gulf on 27 January and began landing troops and cargo. That afternoon, she completed the unloading operations, got underway, and returned to Leyte on 30 January.

The ship remained at Leyte until 2 February when she headed for Guadalcanal. En route, she received orders diverting her to Milne Bay, New Guinea, where she arrived on 10 February. After loading 11 LCMs, she departed Milne Bay on the 13th and arrived at Guadalcanal on the 15th. There, she reported for duty with Transport Squadron 18 (TransRon 18). On 27 February, she departed Guadalcanal, bound for the Russell Islands to conduct amphibious training there with elements of the 1st Marine Division. On 15 March, she departed the Russell Islands, bound ultimately for Okinawa. En route, she stopped at Ulithi for six days before continuing on to the Ryūkyūs.

=== Okinawa ===
White Marsh and her division mates arrived off Okinawa during the night of 31 March – 1 April. Early in the morning, she disembarked her troops for the landings on Okinawa. Once again, after completing the disembarkation process, the dock landing ship anchored and began landing craft repair duty. Throughout her two-month stay at Okinawa, enemy air activity was heavy, but White Marsh only engaged Japanese aircraft on three occasions – on 6, 12, and 15 April – and claimed hits on two of the attackers.

On 3 June, the ship departed Okinawa and proceeded to Leyte. She entered San Pedro Bay on 8 June and remained there for three days. On the 11th, the ship moved to Manicani Island where she loaded six motor torpedo boats and their crews for transportation to Okinawa. She left Manicani on 15 June and arrived in Kerama Retto on the 19th. She discharged cargo and personnel during the next two days and began a voyage to the Philippines on the 22d. She arrived at Leyte on 27 June and began a period of tender availability.

White Marsh remained at Leyte until 14 July when she got underway for home. She stopped at Eniwetok on 21 July, loaded cargo and passengers, resumed her voyage, and arrived at Oahu on 29 July. She remained there only overnight and, the next day, got underway for the West Coast. The ship reached San Francisco on 29 July and was receiving repairs there when Japan capitulated in mid-August.

=== Post-war service ===
White Marsh sailed for the Aleutians on 26 August and arrived at Adak Island on 3 September but departed again the following day, bound for the Japanese island of Honshū. She put into Ominato Ko on 11 September and reported for duty with the logistic support group assigned to the Northern Japan Occupation Force, which she served as a small craft repair ship and a floating boat pool until 25 November when she departed Japan to return to the United States.

Steaming via Pearl Harbor, she arrived at San Pedro, California, on 15 December. From there, she moved on, via the Panama Canal, to New Orleans for a brief tour of duty with the Atlantic Fleet before being decommissioned at Norfolk in March 1946 and beginning over four and one-half years in reserve there.

== 1950–1960 ==
On 8 November 1950 – as a part of the Navy's expansion of its active forces to enable it to meet its increased demands during the Korean War — White Marsh was placed back in commission. During the period from her reactivation to the beginning of 1954, she alternated two deployments to the 6th Fleet with Atlantic Fleet service along the East Coast.

=== Collision with iceberg ===
In the summer of 1953, White Marsh sailed with a task group of transport ships carrying cranes and other equipment to Labrador and Greenland, Operation Bluenose. Off Labrador, en route to Thule, Greenland, the waters were full of huge chunks of ice flowing out of the North Atlantic. On 9 July an ice breaking ship led a small column of ships. A troop carrier was immediately behind the ice breaker with the White Marsh closely following the troop ship. A huge mass of ice ripped a 40-foot gash in White Marsh's starboard side pump room. Three men barely escaped the damaged room, and the ship immediately took on a six-degree starboard list.

The Navy sent a rescue ship to assist White Marsh. As an LSD, White Marsh had ballast tanks that allowed it to be lowered into the water for loading. To aid emergency repair efforts, the ballast tanks were used to lift the damaged side of the ship out of the water. While maintaining a list of 14 degrees, carpenters built a wooden cofferdam using whatever wood they could find. The cofferdam was winched up tightly against the ship with the assistance of Navy divers. Life vests were used to line the dam, making it somewhat watertight. Submersible pumps were manned almost constantly. The dam and the pumps kept the damaged area dry enough for welders to remove the damaged metal and weld a plate onto the gash in the hull. The ship's crew then took the damaged vessel to Saglek Bay in Labrador.

LSD Ashland (LSD-1) was ordered to sail from Thule, Greenland to Labrador to relieve White Marsh. Ashland departed on 10 July 1953, escorted by the United States Coast Guard icebreaker USCGC Westwind (WAGB-281) and then an additional ice breaker, USS Atka (AGB-3), but due to an immense ice pack, did not arrive to join White Marsh at harbor in Saglek Bay until 21 July. St. John's Harbor at Saglek was free of ice except for one grounded berg when Ashland arrived. Feverish efforts to temporarily repair White Marsh continued. The Underwater Demolition Team personnel and the U.S. Army personnel who had been aboard White Marsh transferred to Ashland on 22 July. The transfer of equipment from the super deck of White Marsh to the super deck of Ashland had to wait until White Marsh was able to be righted. White Marsh was finally in a condition to righted late 24 July, the remainder of the equipment was then transferred to Ashland. With the temporary patch in place, White Marsh was able to make it to a shipyard in Baltimore, where it eventually required more than $600,000 in repairs. The ship's crew received commendations from their commanding officer shortly after the event, attributing the ship's survival to the "combined thoughts, ingenuity, initiative, and laborious hours of all hands."

=== Transfer to the Pacific Fleet ===
In January 1954, White Marsh's home port was changed to San Diego, California; and the ship was reassigned to the Pacific Fleet. Between January 1954 and September 1956, the dock landing ship made two deployments to the western Pacific during which she conducted amphibious exercises and made port visits to various Far Eastern ports such as Hong Kong and Yokosuka. When not deployed to the Orient, she conducted routine operations out of San Diego.

=== Final US Naval service ===
In September 1956, White Marsh was decommissioned once more; but she remained active, serving the Military Sea Transportation Service (MSTS) as USNS White Marsh (T-LSD-8) while manned by a civil service crew. That duty lasted until November 1960 at which time she was transferred, on loan, to the Republic of China.

White Marsh earned four battle stars for her World War II service.

== ROCS Chung Cheng (LSD-191) ==
The ship served in the Republic of China Navy as ROCS Chung Cheng (LSD-191; Chinese: 中正). On 1 January 1977, she was permanently transferred to the ROC Navy. Chung Cheng was scrapped in 1985; her name and pennant number were assigned to the former USS Comstock.
