= James Sargent Russell =

United States Navy admiral (1903–1996)

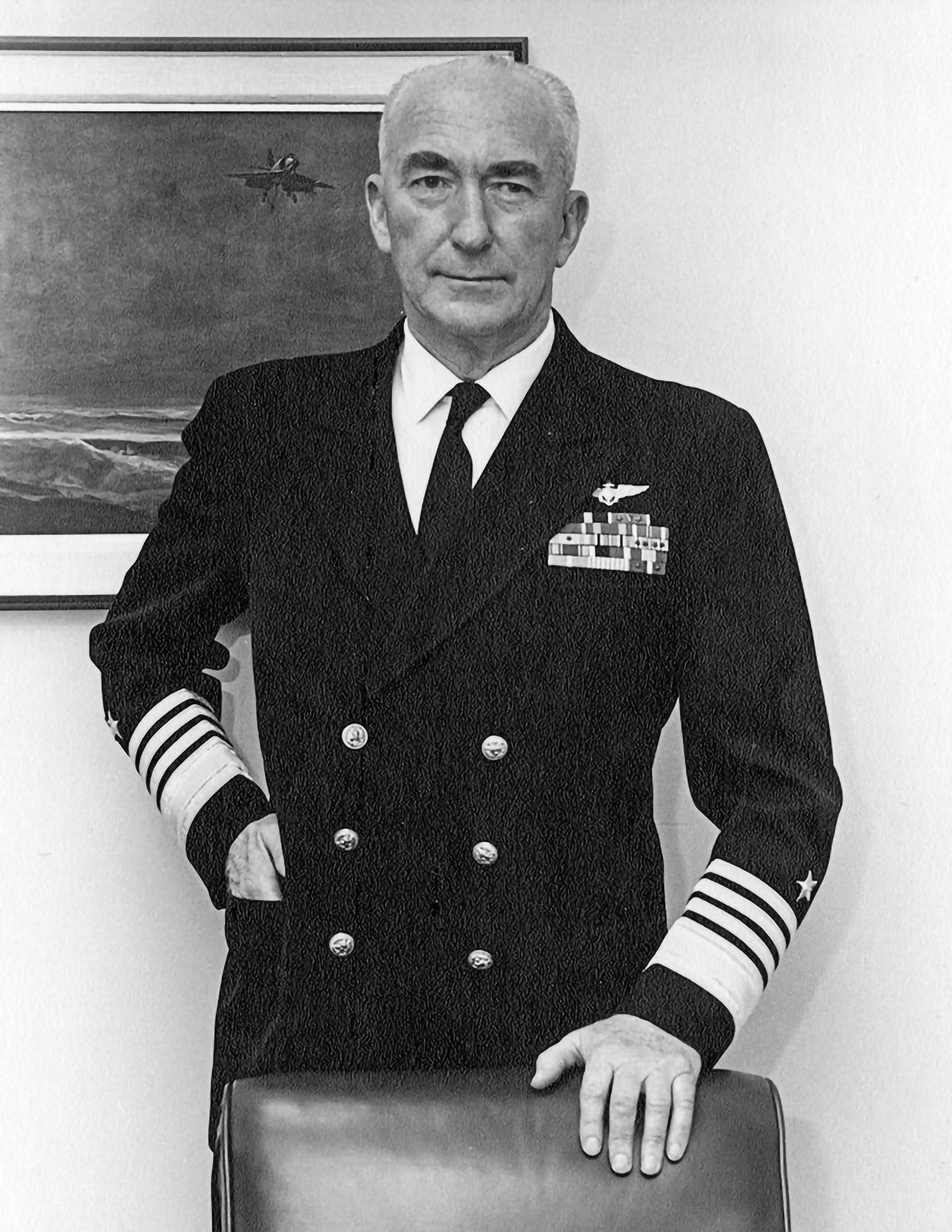
- James Sargent Russell
- Born: March 22, 1903; Tacoma, Washington, US
- Died: April 14, 1996 (aged 93); Lakewood, Washington, US
- Military career
- Branch: United States Navy
- Service years: 1922–1965
- Rank: Admiral
- Commands: VP-42; USS Bairoko (CVE-115); USS Coral Sea (CV-43)
- Conflicts: World War II; Korean War; Cold War
- Awards: Distinguished Flying Cross; Air Medal; Legion of Merit with 2 Gold Stars

James Sargent Russell (March 22, 1903 – April 14, 1996) was an admiral in the United States Navy.

== Biography ==
Russell was born in Tacoma, Washington, the son of noted architect Ambrose J. Russell and Loella Janet (Sargent) Russell. He attended DeKoven Hall School and graduated from Stadium High School in 1918. He joined the Merchant Marine as an ordinary seaman, before entering the United States Naval Academy in 1922. He graduated, and was commissioned as ensign, on 3 June 1926.

Russel served aboard the battleship West Virginia (BB-48). He entered the flight training program at Naval Air Station Pensacola, and was designated a Naval Aviator in 1929.

In the next decade he was assigned to tours of aviation duty both aboard ship and ashore, and also obtained a Master of Science degree in Aeronautical Engineering from the California Institute of Technology.

In July 1941 Russell joined Patrol Squadron 42 (VP-42), a PBY squadron based in the Aleutians, and on August 16 of that same year, assumed command. When the United States entered World War II he led VP-42 into action against Japanese forces in the Aleutian Islands Campaign, receiving the Distinguished Flying Cross and the Air Medal for his actions in leading his squadron against the enemy in "extremely hazardous weather conditions". Later that same year he was awarded the Legion of Merit for his "exceptionally meritorious" services in establishing advanced bases in the area and operating his squadron from them. His squadron was itself also awarded a Navy Unit Commendation. While in command of VP-42, Russell played a key role in the capture of the Akutan Zero.

Russell returned to Washington for duty in the office of the Chief of Naval Operations and the Bureau of Aeronautics. He then returned to the Pacific as chief of staff to the commander of Carrier Division 2, part of the Fast Carrier Task Force. For his planning and coordination of the Striking Group in action against the Japanese he was awarded a Gold Star in lieu of a second Legion of Merit.

After the war, he commanded the escort carrier Bairoko (CVE-115). He then reported to the U.S. Atomic Energy Commission for duty as commander of the commission's task group during the "Operation Sandstone" atomic bomb tests of 1948. For his contribution to the successful completion of these tests, he was awarded a second Gold Star in lieu of a third Legion of Merit.

From 1951 until March 1952 Russell commanded the aircraft carrier Coral Sea (CV-43) as a unit of the Sixth Fleet in the Mediterranean. He was promoted to the rank of rear admiral in 1953. On 16 May 1954 he became commander of Carrier Division 17, and in October of that year transferred to command of Carrier Division 5.

On 4 March 1955, he assumed the duties of chief of the Bureau of Aeronautics. In that position he was awarded the 1956 Collier Trophy, along with Mr. C. J. McCarthy of Chance Vought Aircraft, for their work in the development of the Vought F-8 Crusader supersonic fighter – the outstanding contribution to aviation in that year.

From June 1957 Russell served as deputy commander in chief of the Atlantic Fleet with the rank of vice admiral before being appointed Vice Chief of Naval Operations on 21 July 1958 with the four-star rank of admiral. He served in that post until 1962, and then as Commander-in-Chief of NATO's Allied Forces Southern Europe (CinCAFSOUTH) before retiring in 1965. He died in Lakewood, Washington on April 14, 1996 at the age of 93.

== Decorations ==
Apart from his US military medals Russell was awarded French Legion of Honor; Greece's Order of George I; Italy's Order of Merit of the Italian Republic; Peru's Great Cross of Naval Merit; and Brazil's Order of Naval Merit.

Naval Aviator insignia
1st Row	Navy Distinguished Service Medal w/ Gold Star		
2nd Row	Legion of Merit w/ two Gold Stars and "V" Device	Distinguished Flying Cross	Air Medal w/ "V" Device
3rd Row	Navy Commendation Medal w/ "V" Device	American Defense Service Medal w/ Atlantic Clasp	American Campaign Medal
4th Row	Asiatic Pacific Campaign Medal w/ one silver and four bronze service stars	World War II Victory Medal	Navy Occupation Service Medal
5th Row	National Defense Service Medal	Korean Service Medal w/ two service stars	Brazil's Order of Naval Merit
6th Row	Commander of the Legion of Honor	Order of Merit of the Italian Republic, 1st Class	Greek Order of George I
7th Row	Peru's Great Cross of Naval Merit	Philippine Liberation Medal w/ two stars	United Nations Korea Medal
