= Everett Phipps Babcock =

American architect (1874–1928)

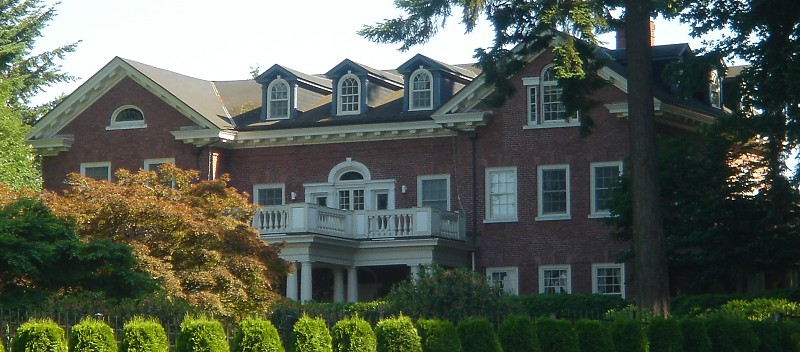
Washington state's governor's mansion designed by Everett Babcock and Ambrose J. Russell's firm

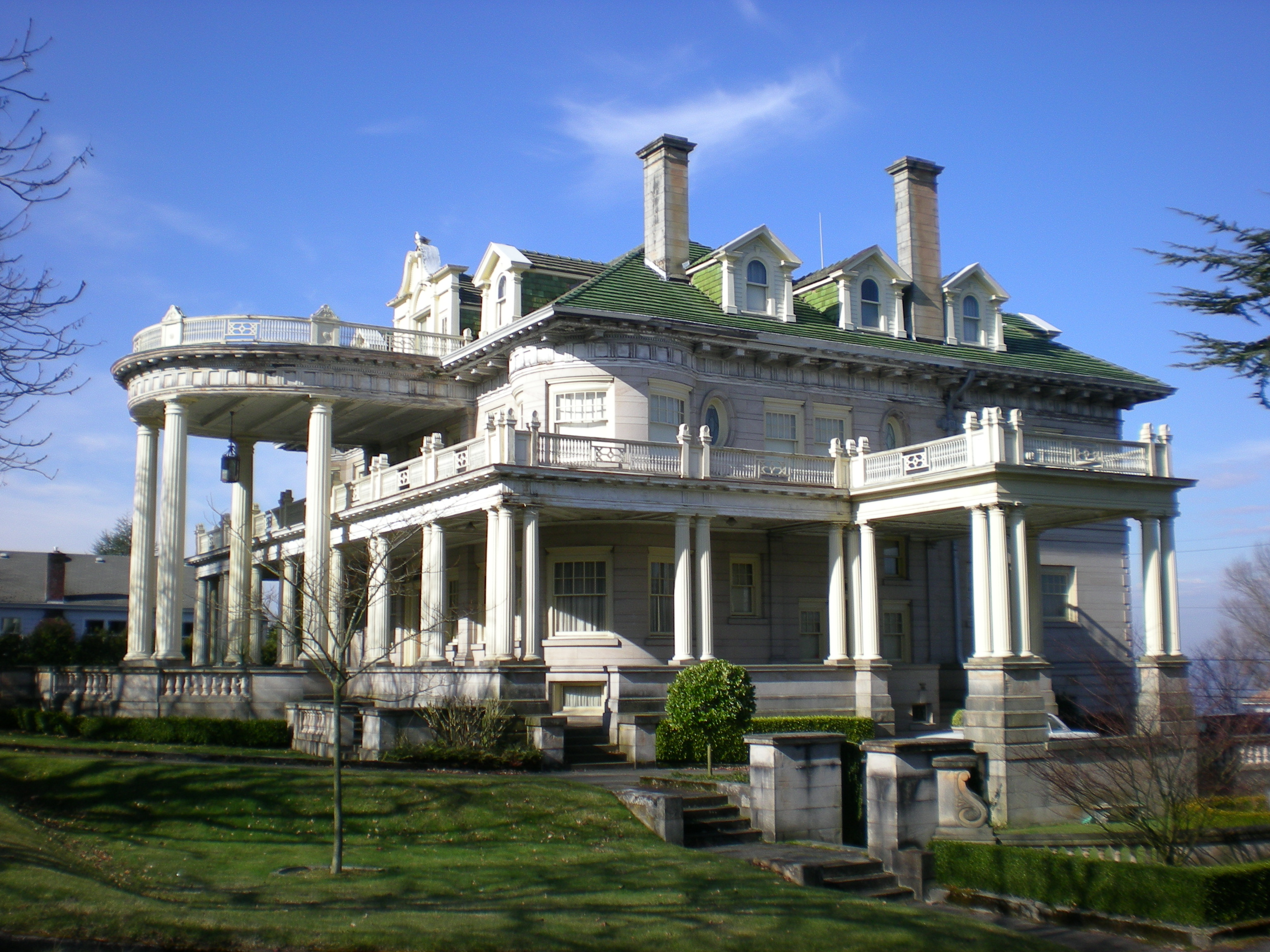
William Ross Rust House designed by Ambrose J. Russell while at Babcock & Russell (a firm with Everett Phipps Babcock), built by Charles Miller

Everett Phipps Babcock (1874–1928) was an architect who worked in the U.S. states of Washington and California.

Babcock worked with Ambrose J. Russell (1857–1938) in Tacoma, Washington on "distinguished residences in various styles". The firm completed the Washington Governor's Mansion in Olympia, Washington. Their work also included the Colonial Revival William Ross Rust House for William Ross Rust (then President of the Tacoma Smelter and Refining) in Tacoma, Washington and the George Gower House (1906).

Babcock also worked in Wallace Neff's office in California. While there he designed the Singer Building (Pasadena, California), built for the Singer Sewing Company in Pasadena in 1926, and later listed on the National Register of Historic Places in 1985.

Babock also built his own residence, a French-Normandy style manor, in 1926. The entry includes a tower staircase and Batchelder tile risers, and there are arched doorways, a formal dining room, butler's pantry, dormer windows, and fireplaces in the living room and masterbedroom. The four bedroom four bathroom house has 4,690 square feet (436 m^{2}), and was owned by Rob Schneider until being put up for sale in 2009.

Babcock was the architect for the residence of Mrs. Col. Herman Hall in Sierra Madre, California. Babcock also designed the Casa Torre Garden Court at 611-627 East California Boulevard in Pasadena, a two-story L-shaped Spanish Revival style apartment building that is included in An architectural guidebook to Los Ángeles by David Gebhard and Robert Winter He was also an architect for William Jarvis Earl's estate in La Cañada Flintridge, California.

Babcock married Bliss Clara Mae Delano in 1908. He died unexpectedly on May 16, 1928, during a routine tonsils removal operation, in Pasadena, California.
