= William Ross Rust House =

Historic house in Washington, United States

- Rust, William Ross, House
- U.S. National Register of Historic Places
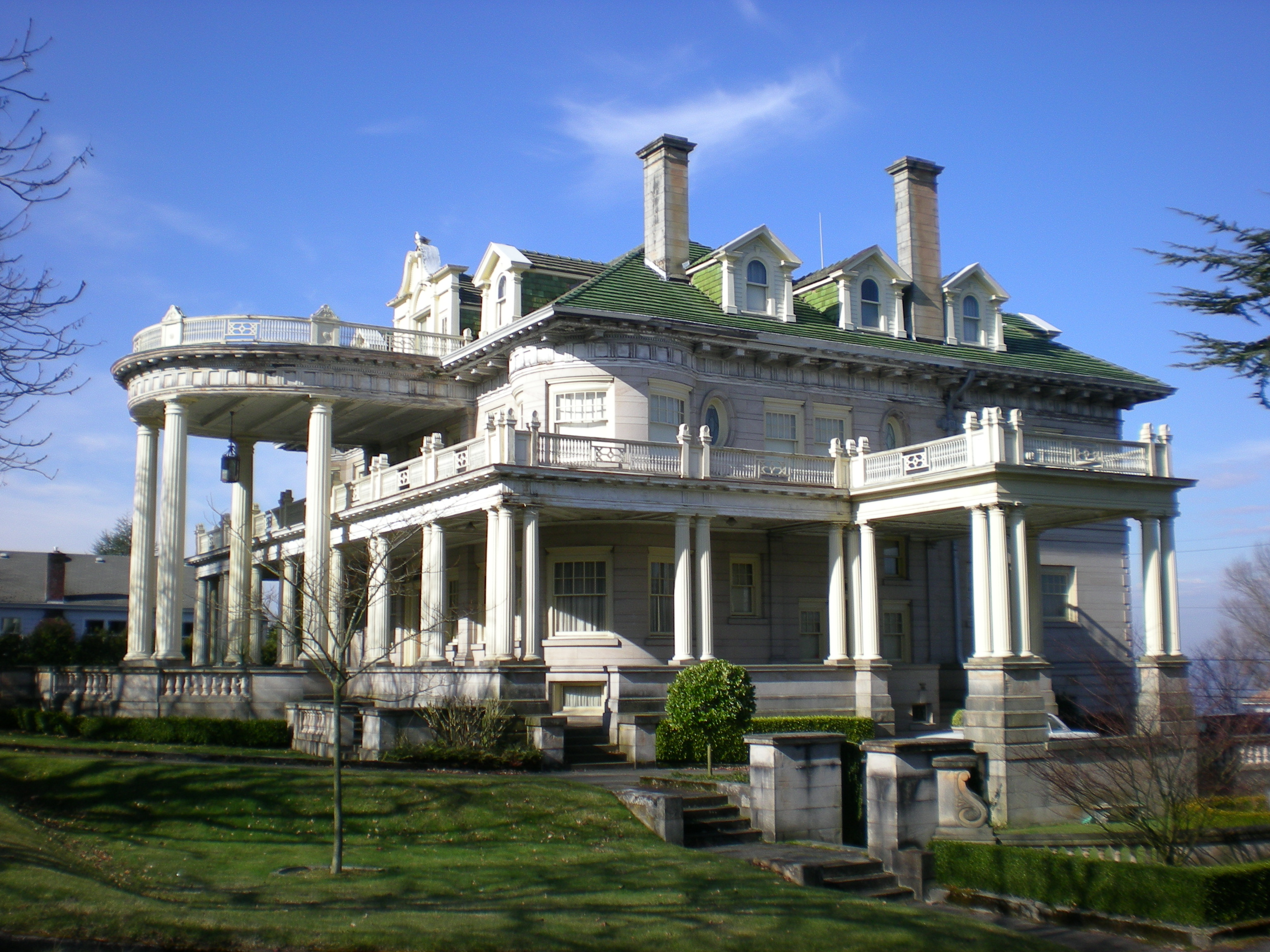

- Location within Washington (state)
- Location: Tacoma, Washington
- Coordinates: 47°15′58.71″N 122°27′47.56″W
- Architect: Russell & Babcock
- Architectural style: Classical Revival
- NRHP reference No.: 85001806
- Added to NRHP: August 23, 1985

The William Ross Rust House is a house in Tacoma, Washington, United States, built in 1905 for William Ross Rust, then President of the Tacoma Smelter and Refining Company. That same year the Tacoma Smelter was acquired by ASARCO, which was controlled by the Guggenheim family. The house was designed by Ambrose J. Russell, who worked for Russell & Babcock with Everett Phipps Babcock, and was built by Charles Miller. Russell & Babcock also designed the Washington Governor's Mansion.

It was built of sandstone from the Wilkeson sandstone quarry in Wilkeson, Washington. The building has a green, glazed terra cotta tile roof, 18 rooms, 4 baths, and 8 fireplaces. It was modeled after the John A. McCall Mansion in Monmouth County, New Jersey (built in 1903, destroyed by fire in 1927). It was added to the National Register of Historic Places on August 23, 1985.
