= Singer Building (Pasadena) =

- U.S. National Register of Historic Places
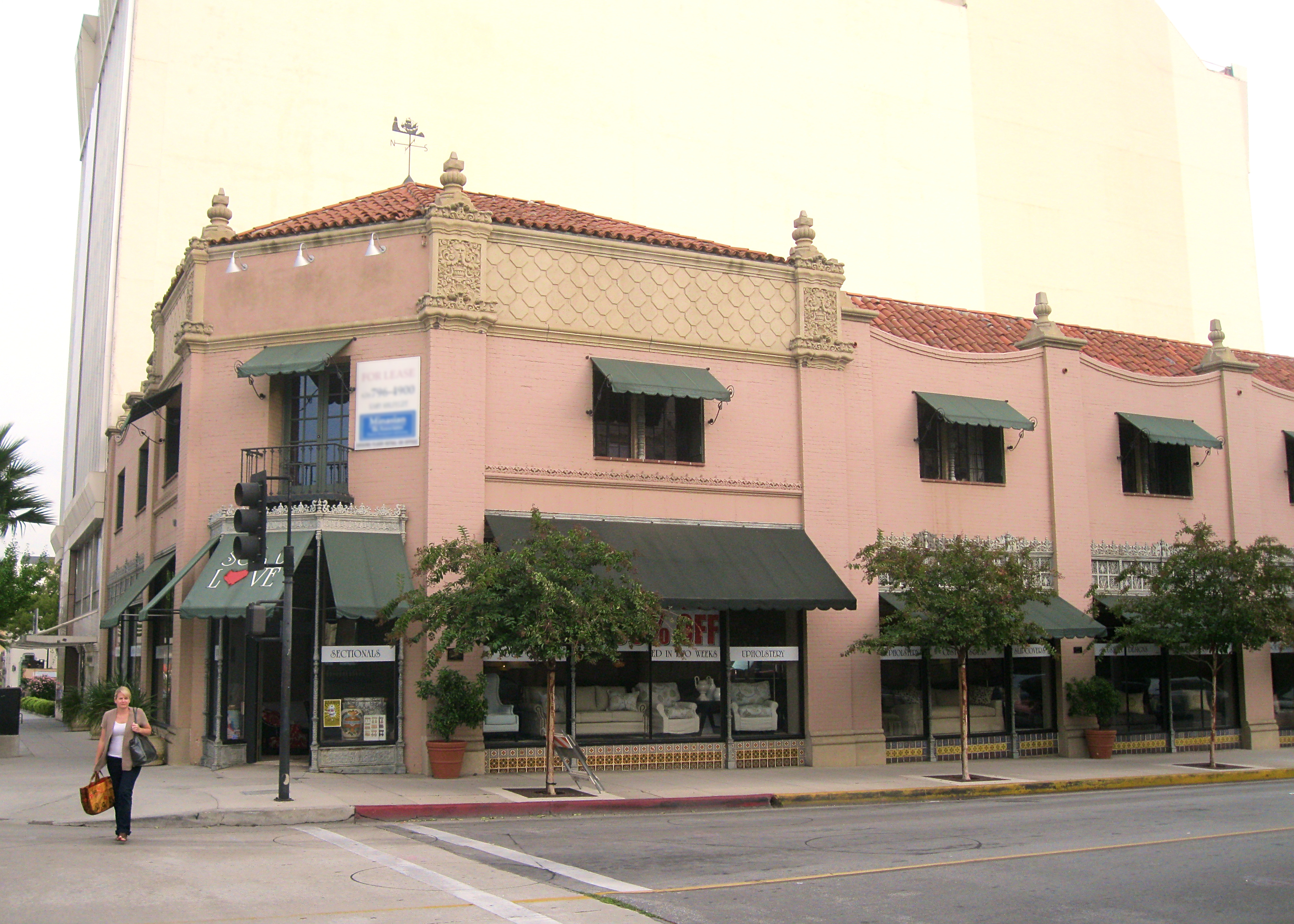

- Location within the Los Angeles metropolitan area Location within California Location within the United States
- Location: 16 S. Oakland Ave. and 520 E. Colorado Blvd., Pasadena, California
- Coordinates: 34°8′44″N 118°8′22″W
- Built: 1926
- Architect: Babcock, Everett Phipps
- Architectural style: Spanish Colonial Revival
- NRHP reference No.: 85001066
- Added to NRHP: May 16, 1985

The Singer Building in Pasadena, California is a Spanish Colonial Revival building located at 520 E. Colorado Boulevard in Pasadena, California. Built in 1926, the building was designed by Everett Phipps Babcock and is his only surviving non-residential design. The Spanish Colonial Revival design of the building was popular in Pasadena in the 1920s. Prominent features of the building's design include a red tile roof, a stone frieze with a tiled pattern, and piers with decorative moldings. The building originally housed a Singer Sewing Machine Company showroom and has since been used for other commercial purposes.

The building was listed on the National Register of Historic Places on May 16, 1985.
