= USS Comstock (LSD-19) =

U.S. Navy dock landing ship

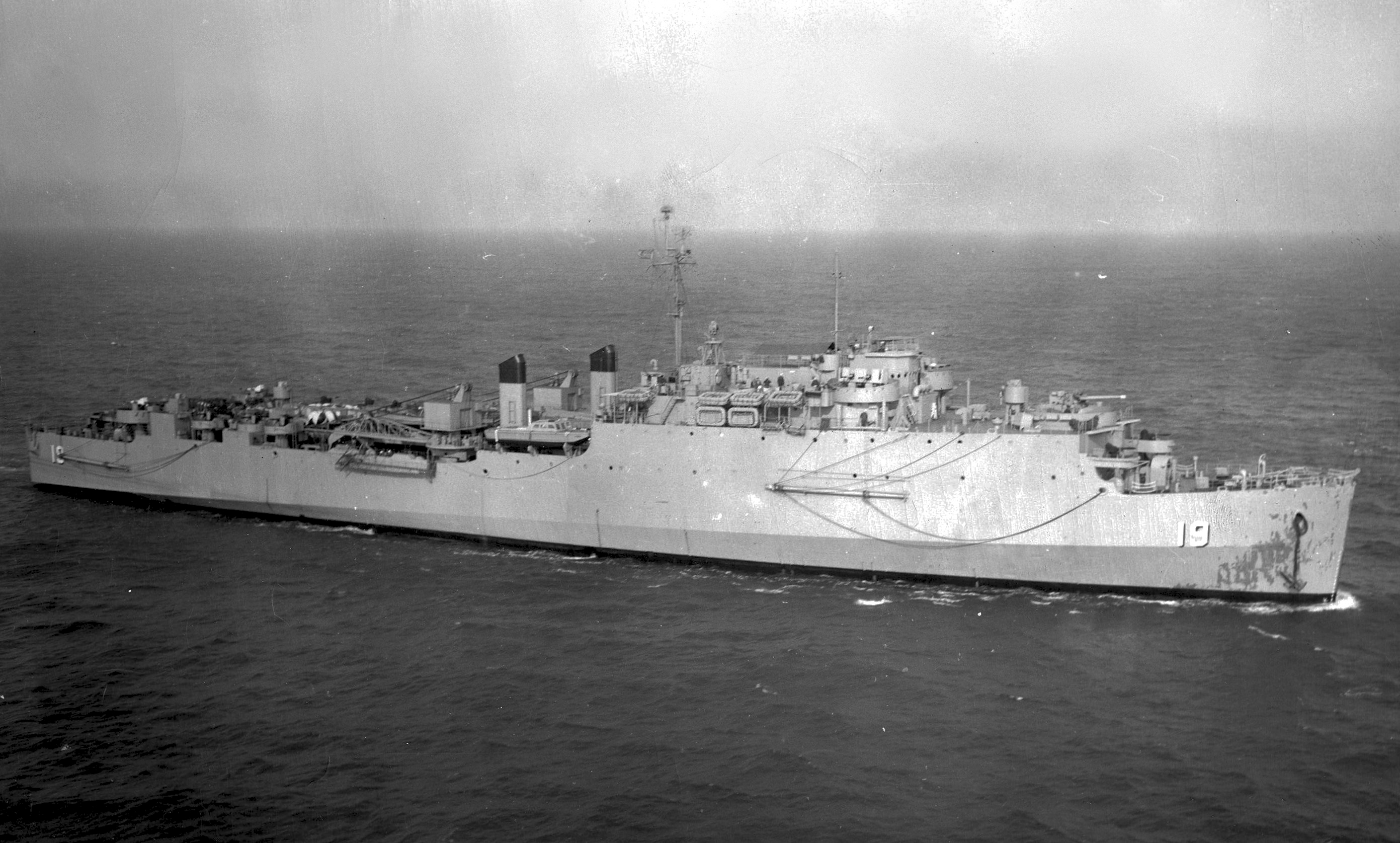
- USS Comstock (LSD-19) underway off Korea, in 1951

History

United States
- Name: Comstock
- Namesake: Comstock Lode in Nevada
- Awarded: 28 July 1943
- Laid down: 3 January 1945
- Launched: 28 April 1945
- Commissioned: 2 July 1945
- Decommissioned: 20 April 1970
- Stricken: 30 June 1976
- Fate: Sold to Taiwan, 17 October 1984

Taiwan
- Name: Chung Cheng (LSD-191); "中正"
- Namesake: Chiang Kai Shek
- Acquired: 17 October 1984
- Decommissioned: 29 October 2012
- Fate: Sunk as artificial reef, 30 June 2015

General characteristics
- Class & type: Casa Grande-class dock landing ship
- Displacement: 7,930 tons (loaded), 4,032 tons (light draft)
- Length: 457 ft 9 in (139.5 m) overall
- Beam: 72 ft 2 in (22.0 m)
- Draft: 8 ft 2½ in (2.5 m) fwd, 10 ft ½ in (3.1 m) aft (light); 15 ft 5½ in (4.7 m) fwd, 16 ft 2 in (4.9 m) aft (loaded)
- Propulsion: 2 Babcock & Wilcox boilers, 2 Skinner Uniflow Reciprocating Steam Engines, 2 propeller shafts – each shaft 3,700 hp, at 240 rpm total shaft horse power 7,400, 2 11 ft 9 in diameter, 9 ft 9 in pitch propellers
- Speed: 17 knots (31 km/h)
- Range: 8,000 nmi. at 15 knots; (15,000 km at 28 km/h)
- Boats & landing craft carried: 3 × LCT (Mk V or VI); each w/ 5 medium tanks or; 2 × LCT (Mk III or IV); each w/ 12 medium tanks or; 14 × LCM (Mk III); each w/ 1 medium tank; or 1,500 long tons cargo or; 47 × DUKW or; 41 × LVT or; Any combination of landing vehicles and landing craft up to capacity
- Capacity: 22 officers, 218 men
- Complement: 17 officers, 237 men (ship); 6 officers, 30 men (landing craft)
- Armament: 1 × 5 in / 38 cal. DP gun; 2 × 40 mm quad AA guns; 2 × 40 mm twin AA guns; 16 × 20 mm AA guns
- Aircraft carried: modified to accommodate helicopters on an added portable deck

USS Comstock (LSD-19) was a Casa Grande-class dock landing ship of the United States Navy. She was the first navy ship named in honor of the Comstock Lode in Nevada, discovered in 1859, which was one of the richest deposits of precious metals known in the world.

The ship later saw active service with the Republic of China Navy as ROCS Chung Cheng (LSD-191), until it was retired in 2012 and intentionally sunk as an artificial reef in 2015.

== USS Comstock (LSD-19) ==
Comstock was launched on 28 April 1945 by Newport News Shipbuilding and Dry Dock Co., Newport News, Va., sponsored by Mrs. H. O. Redue Jr.; and commissioned on 2 July 1945.

=== 1945 – 1950 ===
Comstock sailed from Norfolk on 6 September 1945 and after calling at Pearl Harbor en route, arrived at Okinawa October 20 to join in the occupation activities of amphibious forces in China and Japan. She served in the Far East until 1946, then returned to the west coast, entering Puget Sound Naval Shipyard on 26 May for conversion to a boat pool ship.

After operating along the west coast, Comstock trained in the Hawaiian Islands from July 1947. Between 28 November 1947 and 31 May 1948 she furnished boat pool services to Joint Task Force 7 for Operation Sandstone, the atomic weapons tests at Eniwetok. After calling at Yokosuka, Japan, she returned to San Francisco on 17 June and alternated local operations on the west coast with six brief tours of duty in the western Pacific until the outbreak of the Korean War.

=== 1950 – 1955 ===
Comstock sailed for the Far East 7 July 1950 and arrived at Sasebo, Japan, 12 August, to support the United Nations operations in Korea. She joined in the initial invasion at Inchon, 15 September, and remained there as a repair and salvage vessel until 4 October. She also saw action during the invasion of Wonsan on 26 October. In January 1951 she was assigned as flagship for Mine Squadron 3, and furnished gunfire cover and logistic support during minesweeping operations along the east coast of Korea. On 2 February 1951 she rescued the survivors of Partridge (AMS-31) which had been mined and sunk. She also furnished landing craft for the use of British Royal Marines in their commando raid south of Chinnampo on 20 May. Comstock returned to her home port, Long Beach, on 15 June 1951.

Comstock sailed in Korean waters on three more deployments during the war, serving for most of each with Mine Squadron 3. On her next tour to the Far East, she sailed from Yokosuka 14 August 1954 as part of the task force engaged in Operation Passage to Freedom, the evacuation of Indo-Chinese civilians from Haiphong in Communist North Vietnam. She returned to Yokosuka in October and sailed 7 November by way of Alaskan waters for the west coast. In May 1955 she joined the Surface Support Unit for Operation Wigwam, an underwater atomic test off the coast of southern California.

=== 1956 – 1976 ===
Between that time and December 1960, Comstock returned to the Far East and the islands of the western Pacific for duty in 1956–57, 1957–58, 1959, and 1960. While on the west coast, she frequently operated in amphibious exercises with marines.

Comstock served in several campaigns in the Vietnam War between 1965 and 1969.

Comstock was decommissioned in the early 1970s. She was struck from the Naval Register on 30 June 1976, and title was transferred to the Maritime Administration (MARAD) for lay up in the National Defense Reserve Fleet. Sold for scrapping on 17 October 1984 by MARAD, Comstock was towed to Taiwan for scrapping.

=== Awards ===
Comstock received ten battle stars for Korean War service and five campaign stars for Vietnam War service.

== ROCS Chung Cheng (LSD-191) ==
Since its status was good and consequently saved from being scrapped, the Republic of China Navy replaced ex-White Marsh (LSD-8) with ex-Comstock (LSD-19) and renamed her Donghai (lit. East China Sea), and later Chung Cheng (Chinese: 中正, LSD-191) – the same name and hull number the ex-White Marsh had carried. Chung Cheng is named after the formal name of President Chiang Kai-shek (Chinese: 蔣中正; Wade–Giles: Chiang Chung-cheng). Her forward quad 40mm Bofors guns were replaced at some point by a Sea Chaparral missile launcher, which in turn gave way to a Mk15 Phalanx CIWS late in her service.

As of 2011, Chung Cheng was still active in the ROC Navy, necessitated by the fact that only one Anchorage-class LSD was acquired (which replaced her sister ship Chen Hai).

Chung Cheng (Chinese: 中正, LSD-191) was scheduled to retire from ROC Navy service in July 2012, and it was eventually sunk as an artificial reef off the southwestern Taiwan coast on 30 June 2015.
