= Rhodesleigh =

Historic house in Washington, United States

- U.S. National Register of Historic Places
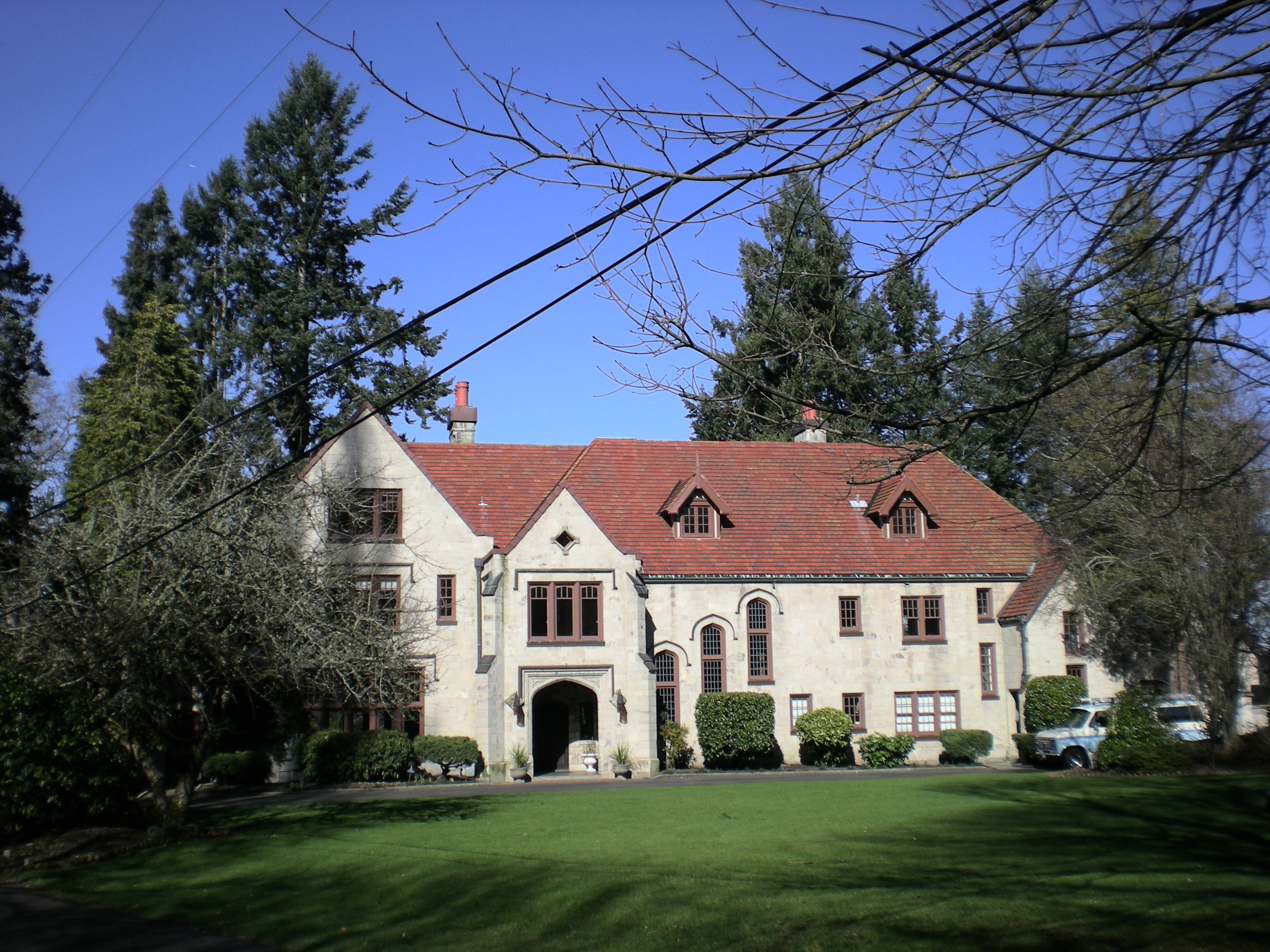

- Location within Washington (state)
- Location: 10815 Greendale Dr., SW, Tacoma, Washington
- Coordinates: 47°9′34″N 122°32′3″W
- Area: 3.5 acres (1.4 ha)
- Built: 1922
- Architectural style: Tudor Revival
- NRHP reference No.: 83003352
- Added to NRHP: January 27, 1983

Rhodesleigh, also known as the Rhodes Mansion, is a historic residence in Lakewood, Washington. Architects involved in its design included Ambrose J. Russell and Frederick Heath.

The house is at 10815 Greendale Drive, and was built in 1922. The Rhodes Brothers were involved in the retail trade and had Rhodes department stores in Tacoma and other areas. The business was established in 1892 as a coffee shop in downtown Tacoma by Albert, William, Henry, and Charles Rhodes.

The 12,600-square-foot (1,170 m^{2}) 1921 house with its 8+ bedrooms and 7+ bathrooms was on sale in 2009 for $3.4 million. Its carriage house (built later in 1941) at 10914 Greendale was also up for sale. It is located on Lake Steilacoom. According to the broker's website, it was built in memory of Edward Rhodes, "who served and paid the ultimate sacrifice in World War I". Rhodesleigh, also known locally as the Rhodes Mansion, is a historic English Tudor–style residence in Lakewood, Washington that was built in 1922 and designed by noted architects Ambrose J. Russell and Frederick Heath for the Rhodes family, who were prominent in the region’s retail history. The house, which features 12,600-square-foot (1,170 m^{2}) of living space and is listed on the National Register of Historic Places, overlooks Lake Steilacoom.

== See also ==
- Rhodes House (Tacoma)
