= Operation Sandstone =

Series of 1940s US nuclear tests

- Sandstone-Yoke, 49 kilotons.

Information
- Country: United States
- Test site: Aomon (Sally), Enewetak Atoll; Enjebi (Janet), Enewetak Atoll; Runit (Yvonne), Enewetak Atoll
- Period: 1948
- Number of tests: 3
- Test type: tower
- Max. yield: 49 kilotonnes of TNT (210 TJ)

Test series chronology

Operation Sandstone was a series of nuclear weapon tests in 1948. It was the third series of American tests, following Trinity in 1945 and Crossroads in 1946, and preceding Ranger. Like the Crossroads tests, the Sandstone tests were carried out at the Pacific Proving Grounds, although at Enewetak Atoll rather than Bikini Atoll. They differed from Crossroads in that they were conducted by the Atomic Energy Commission, with the armed forces having only a supporting role. The purpose of the Sandstone tests was also different: they were primarily tests of new bomb designs, especially the more efficient levitated pits, rather than of the effects of nuclear weapons. Three tests were carried out in April and May 1948 by Joint Task Force 7, with a work force of 10,366 personnel, of whom 9,890 were military.

The successful testing of the new cores in the Operation Sandstone tests rendered every component of the old weapons obsolete. Even before the third test had been carried out, production of the old cores was halted, and all effort concentrated on the new Mark 4 nuclear bomb, which would become the first mass-produced nuclear weapon. More efficient use of fissionable material as a result of Operation Sandstone would increase the U.S. nuclear stockpile from 56 bombs in June 1948 to 169 in June 1949.

== Origins ==
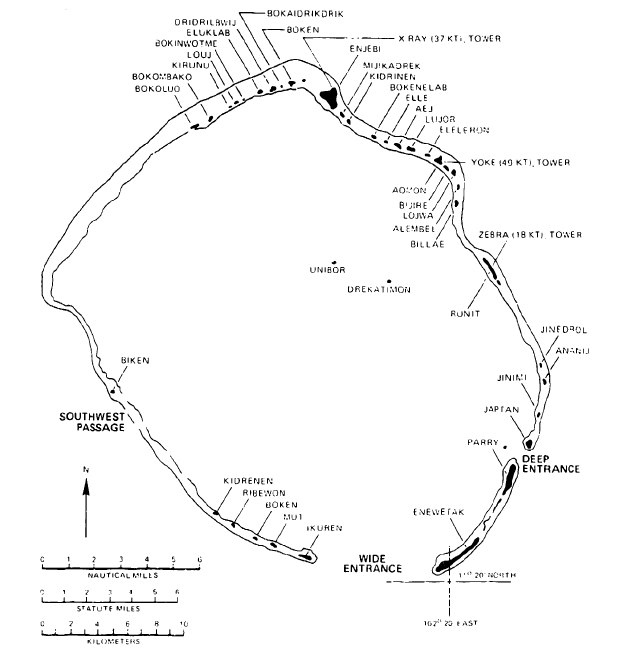
Enewetak Atoll

Nuclear weapons were developed during World War II by the Manhattan Project, which created a network of production facilities, and the weapons research and design laboratory at the Los Alamos National Laboratory. Two types of bombs were developed: the Mark 1 Little Boy, a gun-type fission weapon using uranium-235, and the Mark 3 Fat Man, an implosion-type nuclear weapon using plutonium.

These weapons were not far removed from their laboratory origins. A great deal of work remained to improve ease of assembly, safety, reliability and storage before they were ready for production. There were also many improvements to their performance that had been suggested or recommended during the war that had not been possible under the pressure of wartime development. Norris Bradbury, who replaced Robert Oppenheimer as director at Los Alamos, felt that "we had, to put it bluntly, lousy bombs."

Plutonium was produced by irradiating uranium-238 in three 250 MW nuclear reactors at the Hanford site. In theory they could produce 0.91 grams (0.032 oz) of plutonium per megawatt-day, or about 20 kilograms (44 lb) per month. In practice, production never approached such a level in 1945, when only between 4 and 6 kilograms (8.8 and 13.2 lb) was produced per month. A Fat Man core required about 6.2 kilograms (14 lb) of plutonium, of which 21% fissioned. In the immediate aftermath of the war, plutonium production increased to over 20 kilograms (44 lb) per month by November 1945. But it then began to rapidly fall off, as a result of problems due to swelling of the reactors' graphite neutron moderators. This is known as the Wigner effect, after its discoverer, the Manhattan Project scientist Eugene Wigner.

These reactors were also required for the production (by irradiation of bismuth-209) of polonium-210, which was used in the initiators, a critical component of the nuclear weapons. Some 62 kilograms (137 lb) of bismuth-209 had to be irradiated for 100 days to produce 600 curies of polonium-210, a little over 132 milligrams (2.04 gr). Because polonium-210 has a half-life of only 138 days, at least one reactor had to be kept running. The oldest unit, B pile, was therefore closed down so that it would be available in the future. Investigation of the problem would take most of 1946 before a fix was found. A consequence of this was the decrease of plutonium production at Hanford to less than 10 kilograms (22 lb) per month for most months in 1946.

Uranium-235 was derived from enrichment of natural uranium at the Y-12 plant and K-25 site in Oak Ridge, Tennessee. Improvements in the processes and procedures of the electromagnetic and gaseous isotope separation between October 1945 and June 1946 led to an increase in production to around 69 kilograms (152 lb) of uranium-235 per month, which was only enough for one Little Boy bomb per month. A Fat Man was 17.5 times as efficient as a Little Boy, but a ton of uranium ore could yield eight times as much uranium-235 as plutonium, and on a per-gram basis, plutonium cost somewhere between four and eight times as much to produce as uranium-235, which at this time cost around $26 per gram.

Even before these production issues — the overproduction of highly-enriched uranium relative to plutonium, and the relative scarcity of plutonium — there was a high priority at Los Alamos for finding ways to use U-235 in the implosion design, as it would greatly increase the total stockpile availability over relying on pure-plutonium implosion or pure-uranium gun type weapons. These pressures only became more acute in the postwar period.

== Weapon development 1945–1948 ==
The objectives of the Sandstone series of tests were to:

1. test nuclear cores and initiators;
2. improve the theory and knowledge of implosion type weapons;
3. test levitated cores;
4. test composite cores; and
5. determine the most economic designs in terms of efficient use of fissionable material.

Levitation meant that instead of being immediately inside the tamper, there would be an air gap between the tamper and the core, which would be suspended inside on wires. This would allow the tamper to gain more momentum before striking the core. The principle was similar to swinging a hammer at a nail versus putting the hammerhead directly on the nail and pushing as hard as possible. In order for this to work outside the laboratory, the wires had to be strong enough to withstand being dropped from an aircraft, but thin enough to not disturb the spherical symmetry of the implosion. The Theoretical Division at Los Alamos, known as T Division, had run computer calculations on the levitated core as early as March 1945. The use of the levitated core had been proposed during the planning for Operation Crossroads, but it had been decided instead to use the existing solid core "Christy" design. This was named after its designer, Robert Christy. For Sandstone, however, it was decided that at least two of the three tests would use levitated cores.

The motivation behind the composite core was to make better use of the available fissionable material. The use of uranium-235 in an implosion weapon instead of the inefficient gun type Little Boy was an obvious development. However, while plutonium was more expensive and harder to produce than uranium-235, it fissions faster, because it makes better use of the neutrons its fission produces. On the other hand, the slower reaction of uranium-235 permits the assembly of super-critical masses, making it theoretically possible to produce weapons with high yields. By July 1945, Oppenheimer and Groves were considering using both materials in a composite core containing 3.25 kilograms (7.2 lb) of plutonium and 6.5 kilograms (14 lb) of uranium-235. The composite cores became available in 1946. Los Alamos' priority then became the development of an all-uranium-235 core. By January 1948 the national stockpile contained 50 cores, of which 36 were composite Christy cores, nine were plutonium Christy cores, and five were composite levitated cores. Testing the new levitated, composite and uranium-235 cores would require at least three test firings.

More efficient weapons would require less efficient initiators. This meant that less polonium would be required. At the time of Sandstone, the national stockpile of polonium-beryllium initiators consisted of 50 A-Class initiators, with more than 25 curies of polonium, and 13 B-Class initiators with 12 to 25 curies. During Sandstone, at least one test would be conducted with a B-Class initiator.

== Preparations ==
=== Organization ===
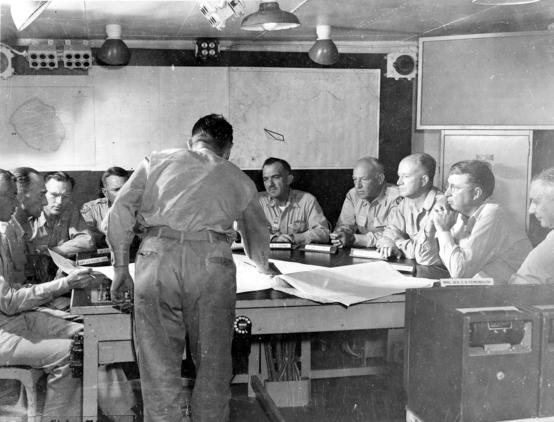
Briefing on the USS Mount McKinley. Pictured are Colonel T. J. Sands, Captain James S. Russell, Dr. D. K. Froman, Brigadier General David A. Ogden, Major General J. D. Barker, Major General W. E. Kepner, Lieutenant General John E. Hull, Rear Admiral William S. Parsons, Rear Admiral Francis C. Denebrink, and Brigadier General Claude B. Ferenbaugh.

The tests were authorized by President Harry S. Truman on June 27, 1947. The Atomic Energy Commission's Director of Military Applications, Brigadier General James McCormack and his deputy, Captain James S. Russell, met with Bradbury and John Henry Manley at Los Alamos on July 9 to make arrangements for the tests. They readily agreed that they would be scientific in nature, with Los Alamos supplying the technical direction and the armed forces providing supplies and logistical support. The cost of the tests, around $20 million, was divided between the Department of Defense and the Atomic Energy Commission. Lieutenant General John E. Hull was designated as test commander. Rear Admiral William S. Parsons and Major General William E. Kepner reprised their Operation Crossroads roles as deputy commanders. Joint Task Force 7 was formally activated on October 18, 1947. As its commander, Hull was answerable to both the Joint Chiefs of Staff and the Atomic Energy Commission.

Joint Task Force 7 consisted of 10,366 personnel, 9,890 of them military. Its headquarters consisted of about 175 men, of whom 96 were on board the USS Mount McKinley. The rest were accommodated on the USS Albemarle, Curtiss and Bairoko. A special division of the Los Alamos National Laboratory, known as J Division, was created specifically to manage nuclear testing. An Atomic Energy Commission group (Task Group 7.1) was responsible for preparing and detonating the nuclear weapons, and conducting the experiments. It consisted of some 283 scientists and technicians responsible for nuclear tests from J Division, the Armed Forces Special Weapons Project, the Naval Research Laboratory, the Naval Ordnance Laboratory, Argonne National Laboratory, the Aberdeen Proving Ground, the Atomic Energy Commission, Edgerton, Germeshausen & Grier, and other agencies.

Each dealt with a different aspect of the tests. The Naval Ordnance Laboratory handled the blast measurement tests, while the Naval Research Laboratory conducted the radiation measurement experiments, and Argonne National Laboratory did gamma ray measurements. Edgerton, Germeshausen, and Grier were contractors hired to design and install the timing and firing systems. Seven experimental weapon assemblies and six cores were delivered to San Pedro, California, and loaded on the weapon assembly ship USS Curtiss, in February 1948, but the Atomic Energy Commission only gave permission for the expenditure of three cores in the tests.

=== Ships ===
The naval forces were organized as Task Group 7.3. It consisted of:

Task Unit 7.3.1

- USS Mount McKinley (flagship)

Task Unit 7.3.2 Main Naval Task Unit

- USS Pickaway
- USS Warrick
- USS Curtiss
- USS Yancey
- USS Albemarle
- USS LST-45
- USS LST-219
- USS LST-611

Task Unit 7.3.3 Offshore Patrol

- USS Gardiners Bay
- USS Henry W. Tucker
- USS Rogers
- USS Perkins
- USS Spangler
- USS George
- USS Raby
- USS Marsh
- USS Currier

Task Unit 7.3.4 Helicopter Unit

- USS Bairoko – 4 HO3S and 2 HTL helicopters

Task Unit 7.3.5 Services Unit

- USS Arequipa
- USS Pasig
- USS YOG-64
- USS YW-94

Task Unit 7.3.6 Cable Unit

- USS LSM-250
- USS LSM-378
- Naval Signal Unit No. 1

Task Unit 7.3.7 Boat Pool Unit

- USS Comstock
- USS Askari
- USS LCI-549
- USS LCI(L)-1054
- USS LCI(L)-1090
- USS LCI-472
- USS LCI-494
- USS LCI-1194
- USS LCI-1345

Source: Berkhouse et al, Operation Sandstone, p. 40

=== Civil affairs ===
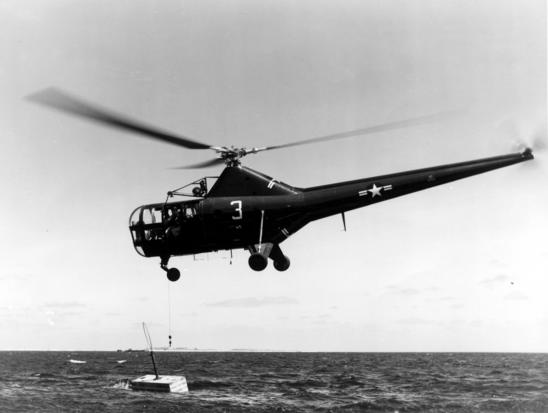
A Sikorsky HO3S helicopter picks up water sample from balsa raft attached to a water sample cable

In September 1947, Hull, Russell, who was designated test director on October 14, and Joint Task Force 7's scientific director, Darol K. Froman from the Los Alamos Laboratories, set out with a group of scientists and military officers to examine various proposed test sites in the Pacific. Enewetak Atoll was chosen as the test site on October 11. The island was remote, but with a good harbor and an airstrip. It also had ocean currents and trade winds that would carry fallout out to sea, an important consideration in view of what had happened at Bikini Atoll during Operation Crossroads.

As the Trust Territory of the Pacific Islands was a United Nations trust territory administered by the United States, the United Nations Security Council was notified of the upcoming tests on December 2. The atoll was inhabited by the dri-Enewetak, who lived on Aomon, and the dri-Enjebi, who lived on Bijire. Their original homes had been on Enewetak and Enjebi, but they had been moved during the war to make way for military bases. The population, about 140 in number, had been temporarily relocated to Meck Island during Operation Crossroads. This time, Ujelang Atoll, an uninhabited atoll 124 nautical miles (230 km; 143 mi) southwest of Enewetak, was selected as a relocation site. A Naval Construction Battalion group arrived there on November 22 to build accommodation and amenities. The military authorities met with the local chiefs on December 3, and they agreed to the relocation, which was carried out by USS King County by December 20. An LST and four Douglas C-54 Skymaster aircraft were placed on standby to evacuate Ujelan in case it was affected by fallout, but were not required.

In January 1948, General William E. Kepner and the Joint Chiefs officially authorized the incorporation of a Long-Range Detection (LRD) element into the Sandstone tests, designating it as Operation Fitzwilliam. This top-secret initiative aimed to establish techniques for identifying nuclear explosions worldwide. The operation remained classified for decades and was not declassified until 2014.

Unlike the Crossroads tests, which were conducted in the media spotlight, the Sandstone tests were carried out with minimal publicity. On April 15, there was still discussion in Washington about whether or not there should be any public announcement of the tests at all. Hull opposed making any announcement until after the series was completed, but the AEC commissioners felt that the news would leak out, and the United States would look secretive. It was therefore decided to make a last minute announcement. There was no announcement of the purpose of the tests, and only cursory press releases. On 18 May, after the series was over, Hull held a press conference in Hawaii, but only permitted the media to quote from written statements.

=== Construction ===
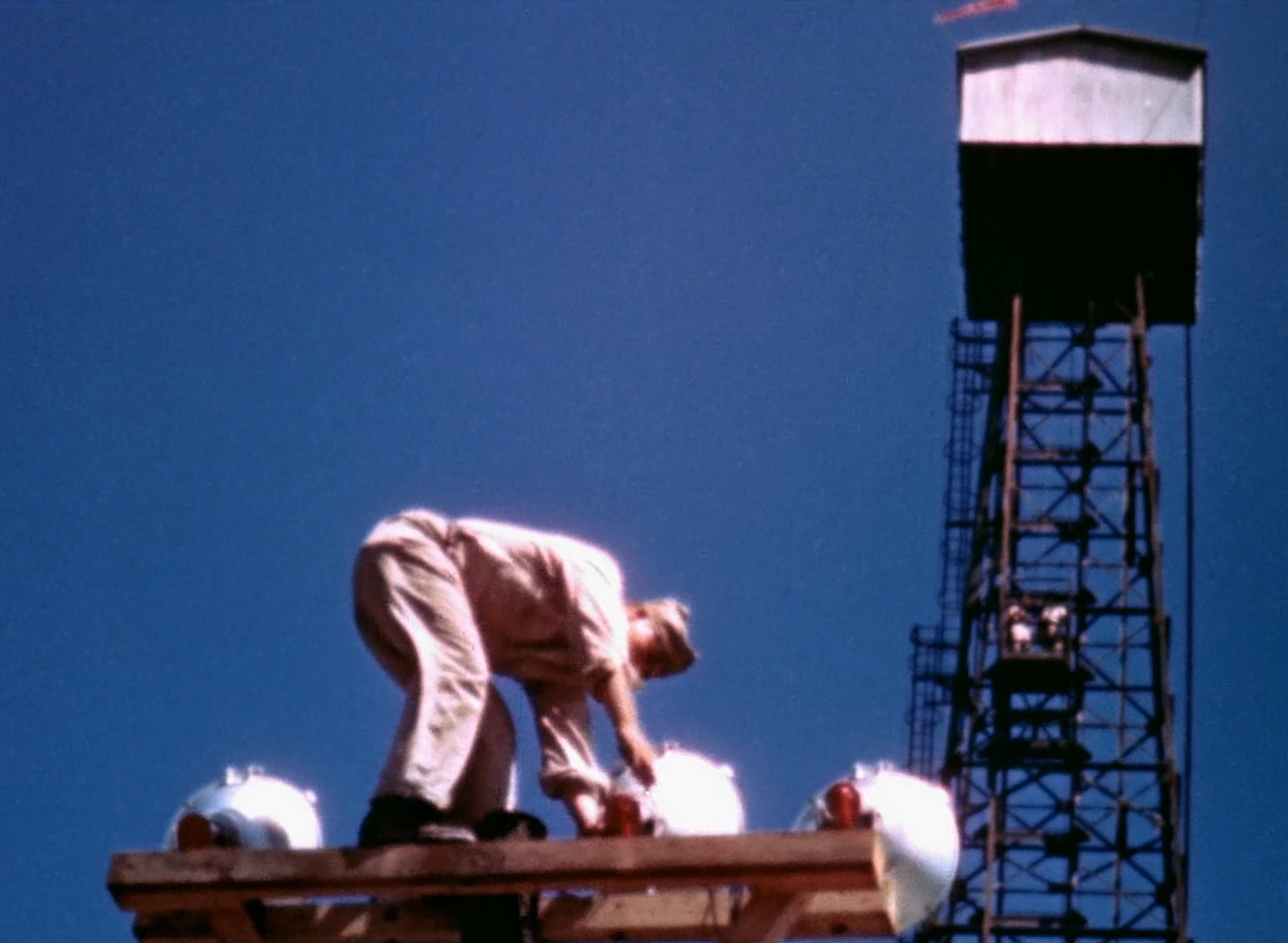
One of the three shot-towers used for the Sandstone-series of tests; unknown device.

Enjebi, Aomon, and Runit Islands were cleared of vegetation and graded level to make it easier to install the required instrumentation, and a causeway was built between Aomon and Bijire so the instrument cables could be run from the test tower on Aomon to the control station on Bijire. The detonations were ordered so that later test areas would suffer minimal fallout from the earlier shots. The Army component, Task Group 7.2, was responsible for construction work. It consisted of the 1220th Provisional Engineer Battalion, with the 1217th and 1218th Composite Service Platoons, the 18th Engineer Construction Company and 1219th Signal Service Platoon; Companies D and E of the 2nd Engineer Special Brigade's 532nd Engineer Boat and Shore Regiment; the 461st Transportation Amphibious Truck Company; 854th Transportation Port Company; 401st CIC Detachment; and the Naval Shore Base Detachment.

== Operations ==
As in Operation Crossroads, each detonation was given its own code name, taken from the Joint Army/Navy Phonetic Alphabet. All used modified Mark III assemblies, and were detonated from 200-foot (61 m) towers. The timing of the detonations was a matter of compromise. The gamma ray measurement experiments required darkness, but the Boeing B-17 Flying Fortress drones that would sample the clouds needed daylight to control them. As a compromise, the Sandstone detonations all took place shortly before dawn.

The detonations in the United States' Sandstone series are listed below:

United States' Sandstone series tests and detonations
Name	Date time (UT)	Local time zone	Location	Elevation + height	Delivery, purpose	Device	Yield	Fallout	Notes	References
X-ray	April 14, 1948 18:16:59.0	MHT (11 hrs)	Enjebi (Janet), Enewetak Atoll 11.66276°N 162.23785°E	1 m (3 ft 3 in) + 61 m (200 ft)	tower, weapons development	Mk-3, Type B levitated	37 kt	I-131 venting detected, 140 kCi (5,200 TBq)	Composite oralloy-plutonium (in a ratio "on the order of 2:1 or greater") levitated core. Hansen and Sublette estimate core was around 5 kg of U235 and 2.5 kg of Pu, on an assumption of 35% efficiency for the Pu reaction and 25% of U235 accounts for the reported yield.	
Yoke	April 30, 1948 18:08:59.0	MHT (11 hrs)	Aomon (Sally), Enewetak Atoll 11.61569°N 162.3194°E	1 m (3 ft 3 in) + 61 m (200 ft)	tower, weapons development	Mk-3, Type B levitated	49 kt	I-131 venting detected, 1.3 MCi (48 PBq)	All-oralloy levitated core. Regarded as "inefficient" use of fissile material.	
Zebra	May 14, 1948 18:04:00.0	MHT (11 hrs)	Runit (Yvonne), Enewetak Atoll 11.5352°N 162.36063°E	1 m (3 ft 3 in) + 61 m (200 ft)	tower, weapons development	Mk-3, Type B levitated	18 kt	I-131 venting detected, 100 kCi (3,700 TBq)	All-oralloy levitated core. Used less than 1/10 the U-235 of Little Boy (which used 64 kg of 80%-enriched HEU). Despite lower yield than Yoke device, was much more efficient in terms of fissile material usage. Considered so optimal that it was put into immediate production for Mark 4.	

=== X-Ray ===
Sandstone X-Ray, 37-kilotons.

The X-Ray nuclear device used a levitated composite core. It was detonated on Enjebi just before sunrise at 06:17 on April 15, 1948, with a yield of 37 kilotons. The efficiency of utilization of the plutonium has been reported as about 35%; that of the uranium-235 was 25% or more. This was somewhat higher than Los Alamos' prediction. Observers watching from ships in the lagoon saw a brilliant flash and felt the radiant heat. A condensation cloud 5 nautical miles (9.3 km; 5.8 mi) in diameter quickly enveloped the fireball, which glowed within the cloud. It took 45 to 50 seconds for the thunderous roar of the explosion to reach the observers.

About 20 minutes later, Bairoko launched a helicopter to check on the cable winch which was to collect samples. It also lowered boats to test radioactivity levels in the lagoon. B-17 pilotless drone aircraft were flown through the clouds, and a drone light tank was used to recover soil samples from the crater. Unfortunately, it became bogged and had to be towed out ten days later.

=== Yoke ===
Sandstone-Yoke, 49 kilotons.

The Yoke nuclear device used a levitated all-uranium-235 core. It was detonated on Aomon just before sunrise on May 1, 1948, at 06:09, a day late due to unfavorable winds. The observers saw a similar flash and felt the same heat as the X-Ray blast, but the 6-nautical-mile (11 km; 6.9 mi) wide condensation cloud was larger, and the sound of the explosion more forceful. One observer likened it to the sound of "a paper bag which is forcefully burst in a small room". They were correct: its yield of 49 kilotons made it the largest nuclear detonation up to that time, but it was considered "inefficient" and "wasteful" of the fissile material.

=== Zebra ===
Sandstone-Zebra, 18-kilotons.

Zebra, the third test, and the last of the Sandstone series, was detonated on Runit just before sunrise at 06:04 on May 15, 1948. This test was characterized by AEC Chairman David Lilienthal as the "hardest and most important" test of the three. By using one of the B-class initiators, it demonstrated that these could still be used with confidence. The observers perceived the flash and blast as similar to the previous two tests, but this time the base of the condensation cloud was at 2,000 feet (610 m), which gave the observers an unobstructed view of the fireball, which therefore appeared to be brighter and last longer than the other two. Looks were deceiving: its levitated uranium-235 core produced a yield of 18 kilotons.

The procedures used in the previous tests were repeated, but this time the winch cable snagged, and the test samples had to be retrieved by a jeep, exposing its crew to more radiation. The Los Alamos personnel assigned to remove the filters from the B-17 drones had apparently carried out the procedure on X-Ray and Yoke without problems, but this time three of them suffered radiation burns on their hands serious enough to be hospitalized and need skin grafting. One of the men who had carried out the procedure for Yoke was then also found to have burns on his hands and was hospitalized too, but was discharged on 28 May. Once again the drone tank gave trouble, and bogged in the crater, but the soil samples were retrieved by the backup drone tank. Both tanks were subsequently dumped in the ocean.

== Outcome ==
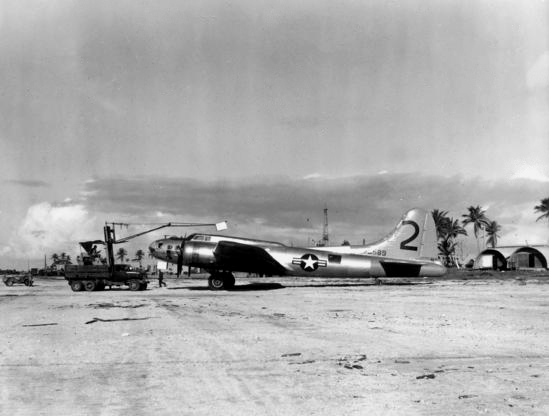
Filters are being removed from a US Air Force Boeing B-17 drone after a flight through the radioactive cloud

The successful testing of the new cores in the Sandstone tests had a profound effect. Practically every component of the old weapons was rendered obsolete. Even before the third test had been carried out, Bradbury had halted production of the old cores, and ordered that all effort was to be concentrated on the Mark 4 nuclear bomb, which would become the first mass-produced nuclear weapon. The more efficient use of fissionable material would increase the nuclear stockpile from 56 bombs in June 1948 to 169 in June 1949. The Mark III bombs were withdrawn from service in 1950. At the same time, new production plants were coming online and the Wigner effect problem had been solved. By May 1951, plutonium production was twelve times that of 1947, while uranium-235 production had increased eight-fold. The Chief of the Armed Forces Special Weapons Project, Major General Kenneth D. Nichols, saw clearly that the era of scarcity was over. He now "recommended that we should be thinking in terms of thousands of weapons rather than hundreds."
