= Ambrose J. Russell =

American architect

- Born: October 15, 1857; Trivandram, India
- Died: March 6, 1938 (aged 80)
- Education: École des Beaux-Arts
- Occupation: Architect
- Buildings: Washington Governor's Mansion, William Ross Rust House

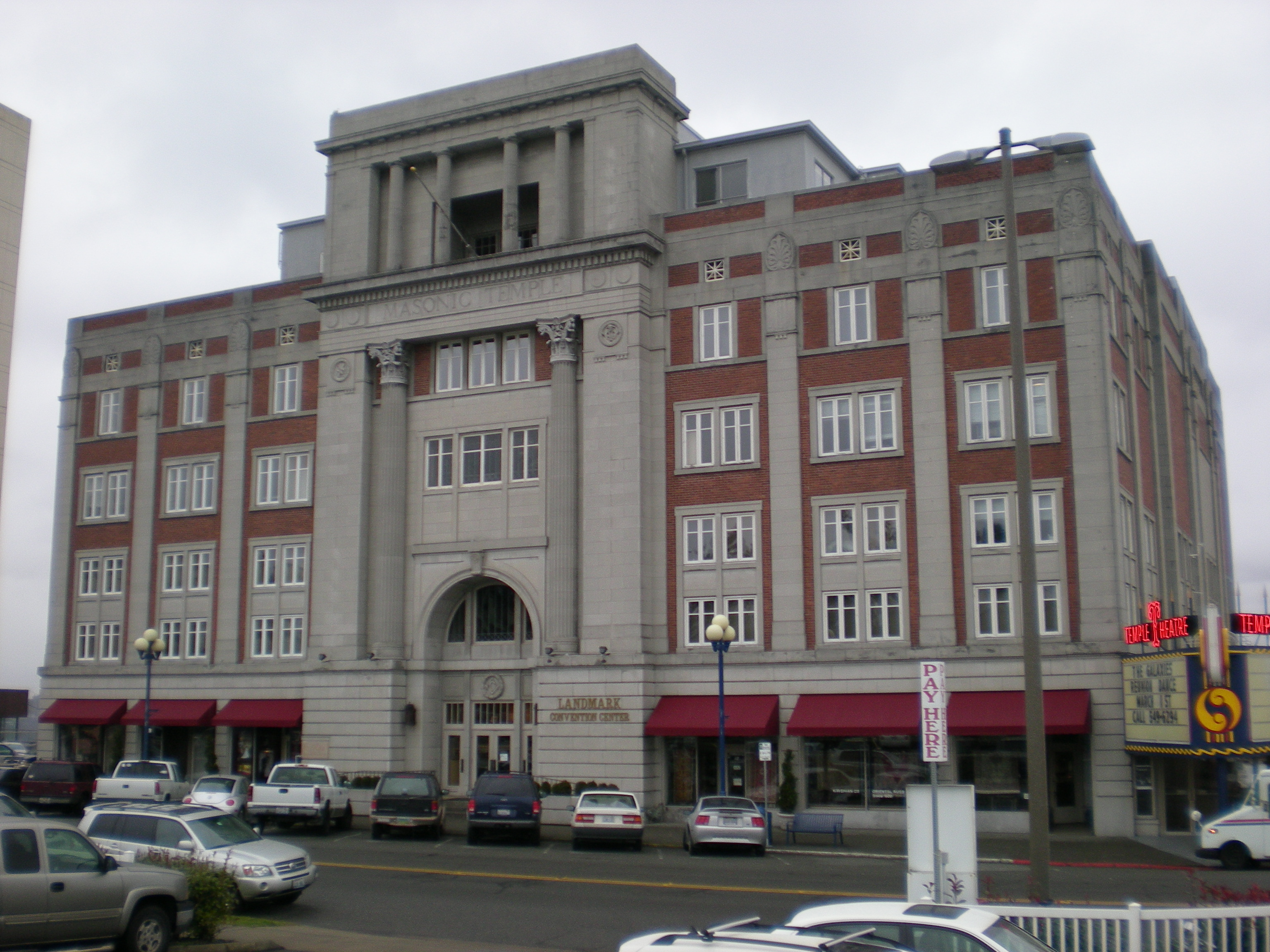
Masonic Temple Building in Tacoma, Washington

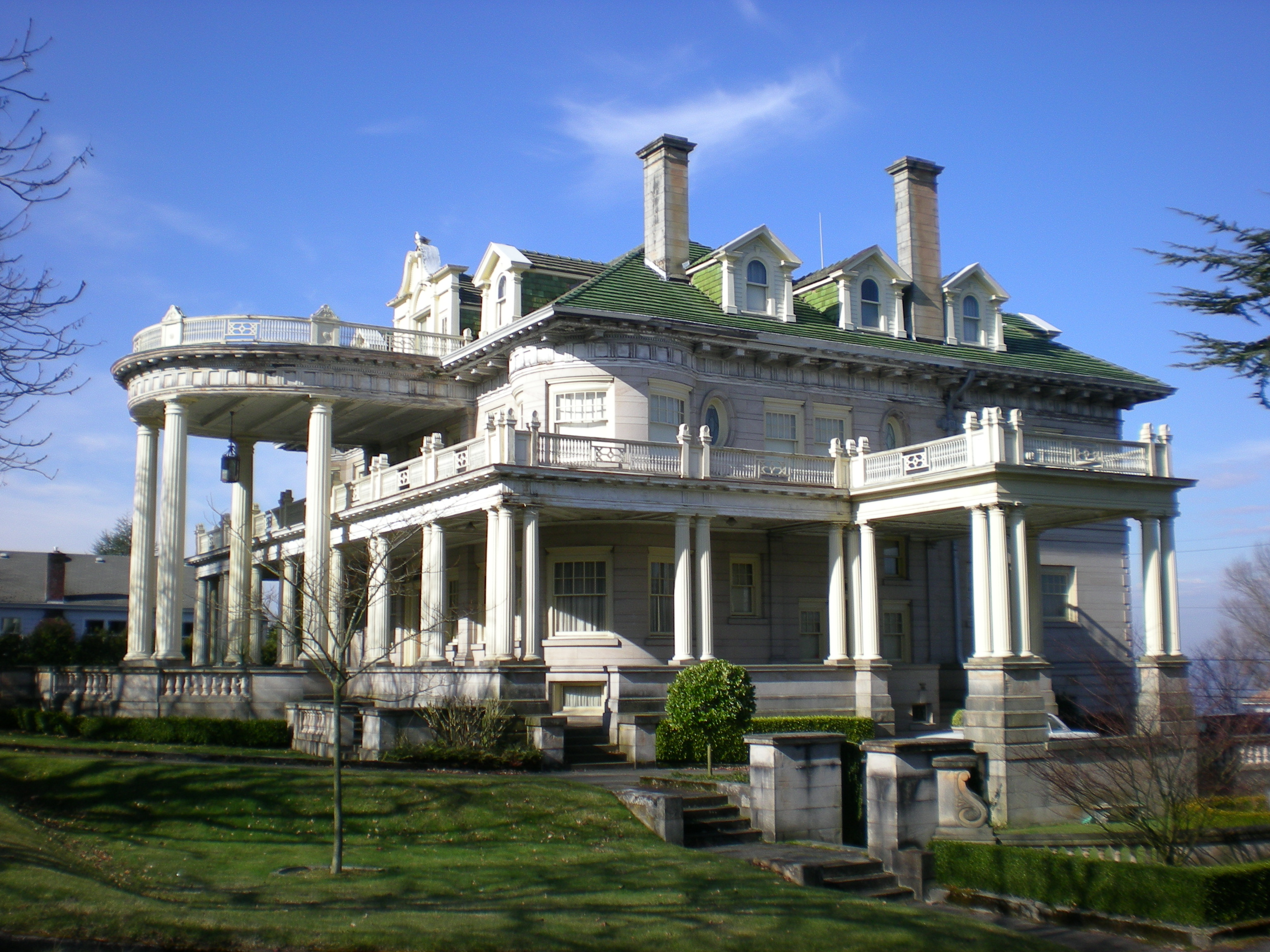
William Ross Rust House designed by Russell while at Babcock & Russell (a firm with Everett Phipps Babcock), built by Charles Miller

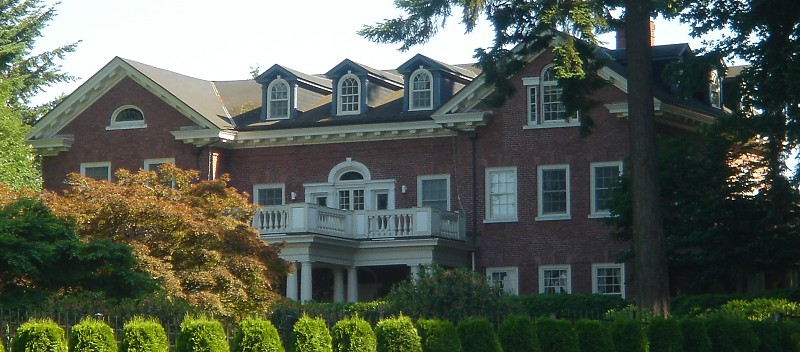
Washington state's governor's mansion designed by Everett Babcock and Ambrose J. Russell's firm

Ambrose J. Russell (October 15, 1857 – March 6, 1938) was an architect in Tacoma, Washington. He was Scottish but born to parents on mission in the East Indies, in the town of Trivandram, India. He was trained in Paris at the Ecole des Beaux Arts where he was a classmate of Bernard Maybeck.

Russell trained in the United States with 19th-century Boston architect Henry Hobson Richardson. Henry Rhodes had Russell and Frederick Heath design and build a house in 1901.

In the Pacific Northwest, Everett Phipps Babcock worked with him. Russell's projects included the Washington Governor's Mansion in Olympia and the William Ross Rust House built for smelter magnate William Rust, costing $122,500. He also designed the Temple Theater, Rust Building, Perkins Building, Tacoma's armory and "many of the city's large mansions" including the Rhodes mansion and the Gower Mansion on E Street.

Admiral James Sargent Russell was his son.
