= Masonic Temple Building-Temple Theater =

- U.S. National Register of Historic Places
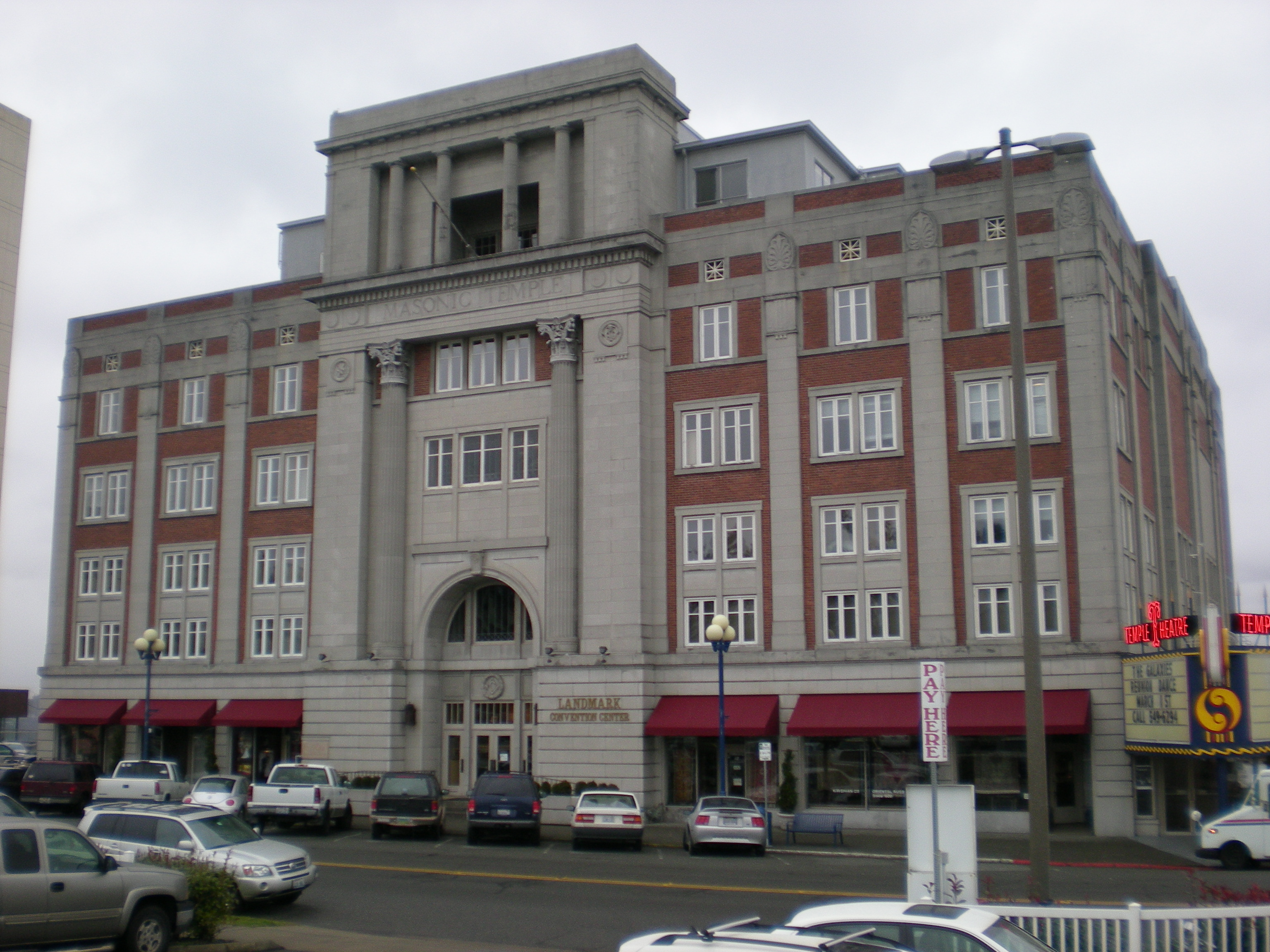
- Masonic Temple Building

- Location within Washington (state)
- Location: 47 Saint Helens Ave., Tacoma, Washington
- Coordinates: 47°15′43″N 122°26′39″W
- Area: less than one acre
- Built: 1927
- Architect: Russell, Ambrose J.
- Architectural style: Late 19th And 20th Century Revivals, Renaissance
- MPS: Movie Theaters in Washington State MPS
- NRHP reference No.: 93000357
- Added to NRHP: April 29, 1993

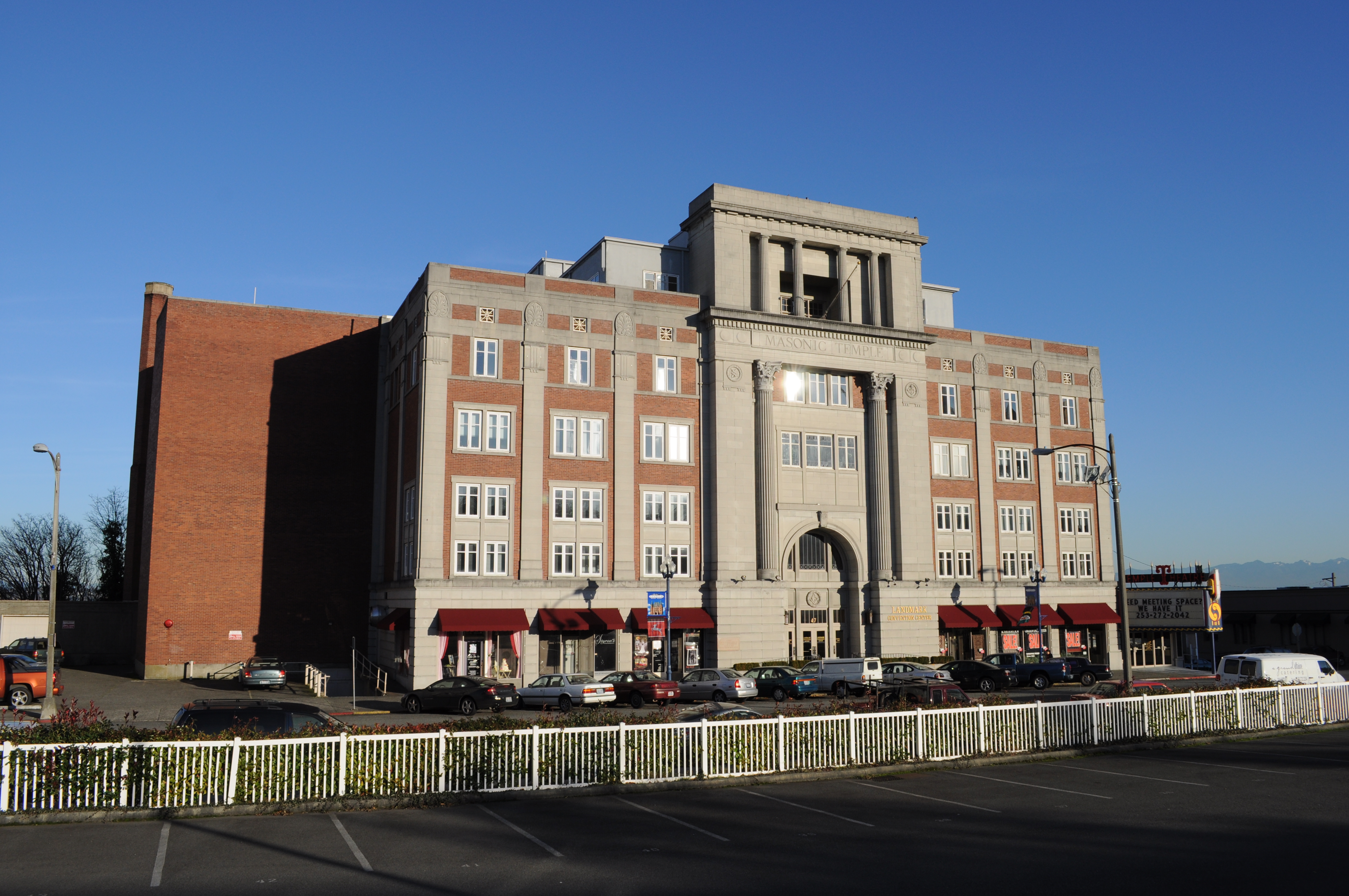
The Landmark from a different angle

The Landmark Convention Center (historically known as the Masonic Temple Building, the Temple Theater, Helig's Theater, and John Hamrick's Temple Theater) in Tacoma, Washington, United States is located at 47 St. Helens Avenue. It was added to the National Register of Historic Places in 1993. Ambrose J. Russell is credited as the architect of the meeting hall and theater. It is said to be in a Renaissance style and Late 19th and 20th Century Revival style, and said to have had its "period of significance" between 1925 and 1949.

For many years the building served as a meeting hall for local area Masonic lodges. Today, no lodges meet in the building and it has been converted into a commercial catering and convention center.
