= Washington Governor's Mansion =

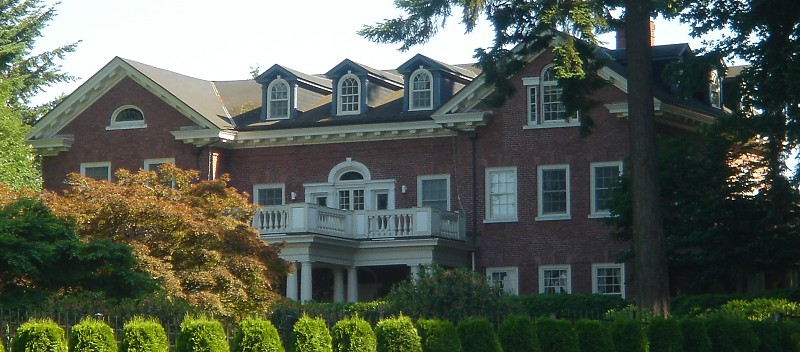
- Exterior of the mansion
- Location: Olympia, Washington, US
- Coordinates: 47.0355°N 122.9063°W
- Built: 1908–1909
- Architect: Everett Phipps Babcock and Ambrose J. Russell
- Architectural style: Georgian Revival

The Washington Governor's Mansion is the official residence of the governor of Washington. The Georgian-style mansion is located on the grounds of the State Capitol campus in the capital city, Olympia. It is on the crest of Capitol Point, with a view of mountains, Capitol Lake and the city.

== History ==
The mansion was designed in 1908 by the architectural firm Russell and Babcock of Tacoma. The residence was built at a cost of $35,000 and has 19 rooms. The cornerstone ceremony was attended by Governor Albert E. Mead, numerous dignitaries, state officials, and several hundred spectators. Mead never lived in the house, however; he was defeated in the Republican primary election of 1908 by Samuel G. Cosgrove, who served for one day (January 27, 1909) because he became ill and was taken to a spa in Paso Robles, California, where he died on March 28. Cosgrove missed the official housewarming, and Lieutenant Governor Marion E. Hay, who became governor after Cosgrove's death, was the first governor to live in the official residence. All governors and their families have lived in the Mansion since.

Hay's wife, Elizabeth Hay, purchased $15,000 worth of furnishings from Frederick & Nelson, and many of these original selections remain, including a mahogany buffet, table, consoles, 18 chairs in the State Dining Room, and the grandfather clock on the staircase landing. In 1915, Governor Ernest Lister and his family moved out because they said there was not enough money to keep the house warm during winter. Electricity eventually replaced gas lighting in the building. The building was weatherstripped during the 1950s as part of renovations, but roof leaks, clanking radiators, faulty plumbing, and sagging floors persisted.

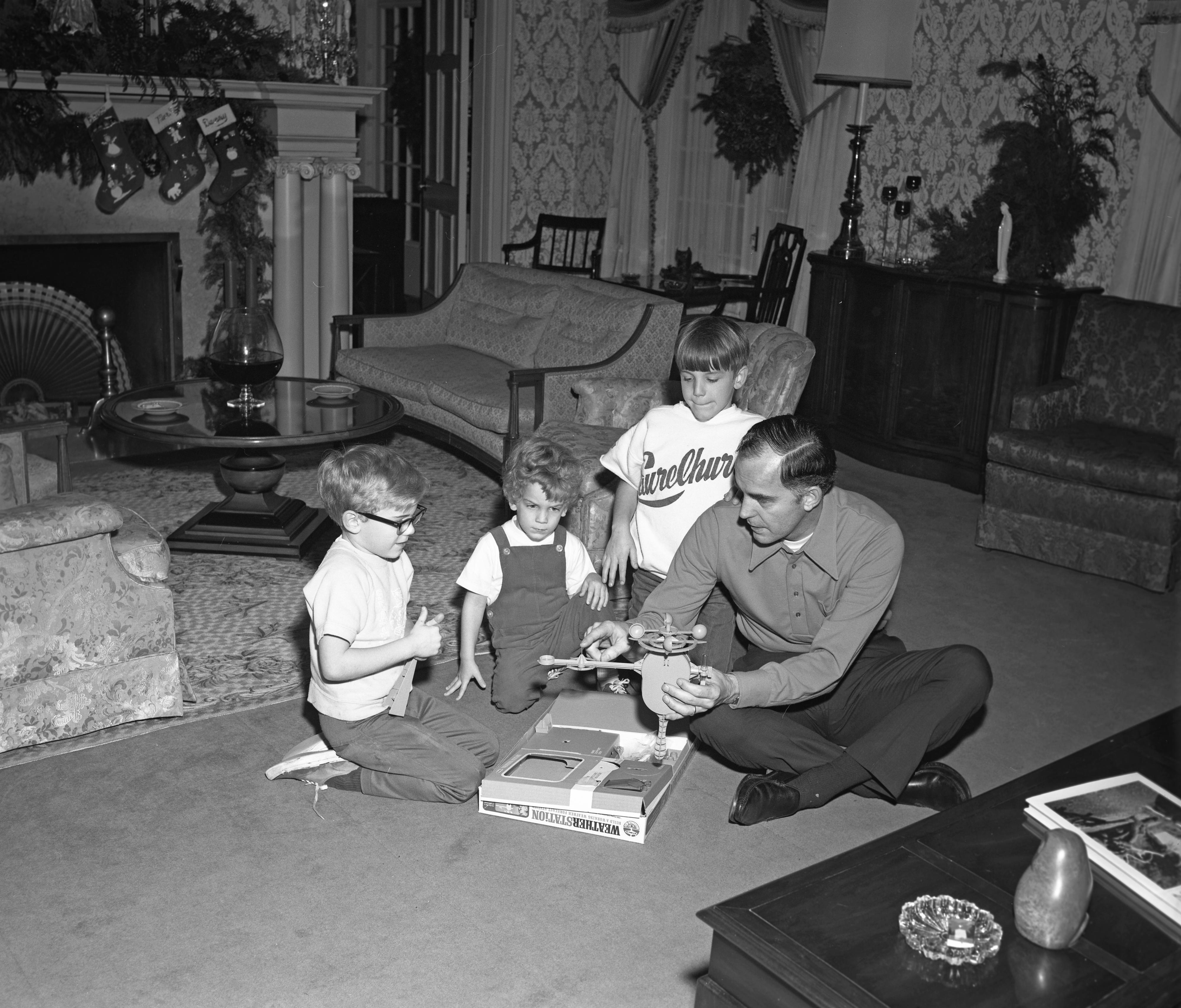
Governor Daniel J. Evans with his children in a residential room of the mansion during Christmas 1969

In 1958, the State Legislature discussed having the structure demolished, as it was on a valuable piece of land, in order to build a new legislative office building. In 1963, three legislators introduced a bill again proposing a new office building on the site.

Governor Daniel J. Evans and his family moved into the mansion in 1965. At the time, costs for a new mansion were estimated to be two million dollars. Evans's wife Nancy advocated for the preservation and renovation of the existing mansion and in 1972 founded the Foundation for the Preservation of the Governor's Mansion, which was renamed the Governor's Mansion Foundation in 1988. In 1973, the Legislature appropriated $600,000 for mansion's remodeling and renovation.

Evans wanted to establish a committee "to stimulate interest in donating furniture, paintings and objets d'art as well as financial support of the mansion's public rooms, maintaining a consistency in design and style. I am endeavoring to form a state-wide committee of importance which will actively seek donations, both tangible and monetary, and whose interest in history and art will help perpetuate public interest in the mansion." The first meeting of the Foundation occurred on May 30, 1972, with 47 women and 5 men present. The Foundation decided to use a master plan prepared previously for refurbishing the mansion by Jean Jongeward, an interior designer from Seattle who donated her services to the project. The plan called for the use of furnishings of the period from 1780 to 1830.

In 1997 Governor Gary Locke and his family were repeatedly harassed by a colony of bats that were cohabiting the mansion. After the governor chased a bat out of his bedroom, the first family were vaccinated against rabies as a precaution. Eventually, as the infestation grew worse, Locke, his wife, child, and cats relocated to a private residence while groundskeepers dealt with the problem. Four years later, in 2001, the mansion was damaged by the Nisqually earthquake.

In 2021, concurrently with the January 6 United States Capitol attack, dozens of armed supporters of then-President Donald Trump breached the mansion's security gates and descended onto the lawn. The crowd attempted to break into the building but were removed by Washington State Patrol. Incumbent governor Jay Inslee was taken to a safe room within the mansion.

== Architectural features, art and furnishings ==
Great Hall

- Empire pier tables (c. 1810) on either side of the entrance of the Great Hall, attributed to Charles Lannuier of New York City, one with its original marble top. Mirrors above the tables were the gift of the people of Clallam County, Washington.
- Set of eight chairs upholstered in gold silk, with claw feet and reeded legs, attributed to Joseph Barry of Philadelphia, given by the Washington State American Revolution Bicentennial, divided between the Great Hall and the Drawing Room.
- Mahogany and bird's-eye maple demilune server (c. 1800), presented to the Foundation by descendants of Audrey P. Holden of Connecticut, attributed to John Seymour of Boston. It has details of turning and patterned veneers for which Seymour is known.

Drawing Room

- Four Duncan Phyfe pieces: Two Pembroke tables, a Federal sofa with deeply incised rail and eagle feet, and a Federal piano. Over the piano is a Constitution mirror (c. 1800) topped with the American eagle, a typical Federal motif.
- Fine two-drawer mahogany sewing stand (c. 1810), with carving attributed to Samuel McIntire of Salem, Massachusetts, active 1757 to 1811.
- Black lacquer Sheraton sofa and English Sheraton chair (c. 1795), and pedestal candle grouped on one side of fireplace, with American Sheraton mahogany secretary behind them.

Library - adjacent to Drawing Room

- Round rosewood table with brass inlay and a sofa, both of English Regency period, given to the Foundation in memory of Governor Samuel Cosgrove
- Books by Washington authors and state-related books

State Dining Room

- Wall panels, painted on canvas by Edwin Chapman of San Francisco (a former Washingtonian) done in the style of Jean Zuber and suggestive of early state history. They are similar to murals selected for the White House by First Lady Jacqueline Kennedy.
- 18 dining room chairs include initials of the needlepointers who made them in 1975 on needlepoint covers; volunteers were chosen in a statewide competition to make the leaf pattern in Persian yarn designed by Sally Kelly of Seattle; a special canvas was made for the governor's chair, which is larger
- 48 table settings of Shenango bone china, with cream body with gold borders and state seal (reproducing the Gilbert Stuart portrait of George Washington) depicted in gold, purchased by Foundation through a gift from the women of Grays Harbor County. In 1977, 48 settings of flat silver in Reed and Barton's "Hammered" pattern were purchased through gifts from the Legislative Wives Club and individual donations.
- 85 place settings of the Lenox "Tuxedo" china pattern also with the state seal. Boeing gave funds for the purchase of 85 settings of flat silver in Lunt's "St. Charles" pattern, a gift facilitated by Paul Friedlander of Seattle.
- A 27-piece sterling silver service that is displayed in the State Dining Room and Ballroom belongs to the state. The silver and gold bullion used in the piece was mined in Washington and features a border of oak leaves and acorns, a traditional design used in the insignia of Navy officers, as well as medallions representing the Department of the Navy, the jack of the United States, and the seal of Washington. A solid silver winged statuette of Victory by Douglas Tilden may be used as a separate ornament resting on an ebony base, placed on top of the punch bowl cover, or on a pedestal in the centerpiece. The set was presented originally by the State of Washington and the City of Olympia in 1899 to the Navy cruiser USS Olympia (C-6) to commemorate the victory of the Battle of Manila Bay the previous year, during which the USS Olympia was the US flagship, with Commodore George Dewey aboard. The service was custom-made in the George II style for the ship by Shreve & Company of San Francisco. When the Olympia was decommissioned, the silver service returned to Olympia, and the city presented it to the state for use in the mansion.
