= USS Anchorage =

USS Anchorage may refer to one of two U.S. Navy ships named for Anchorage, Alaska:

- USS Anchorage (LSD-36), the lead ship of its class, was decommissioned in October 2003
- USS Anchorage (LPD-23), a San Antonio-class amphibious transport dock, commissioned in 2013
