= USS Tarawa (LHA-1) =

US Navy amphibious assault ship

Coordinates: 21.3747974°N 157.9829502°W

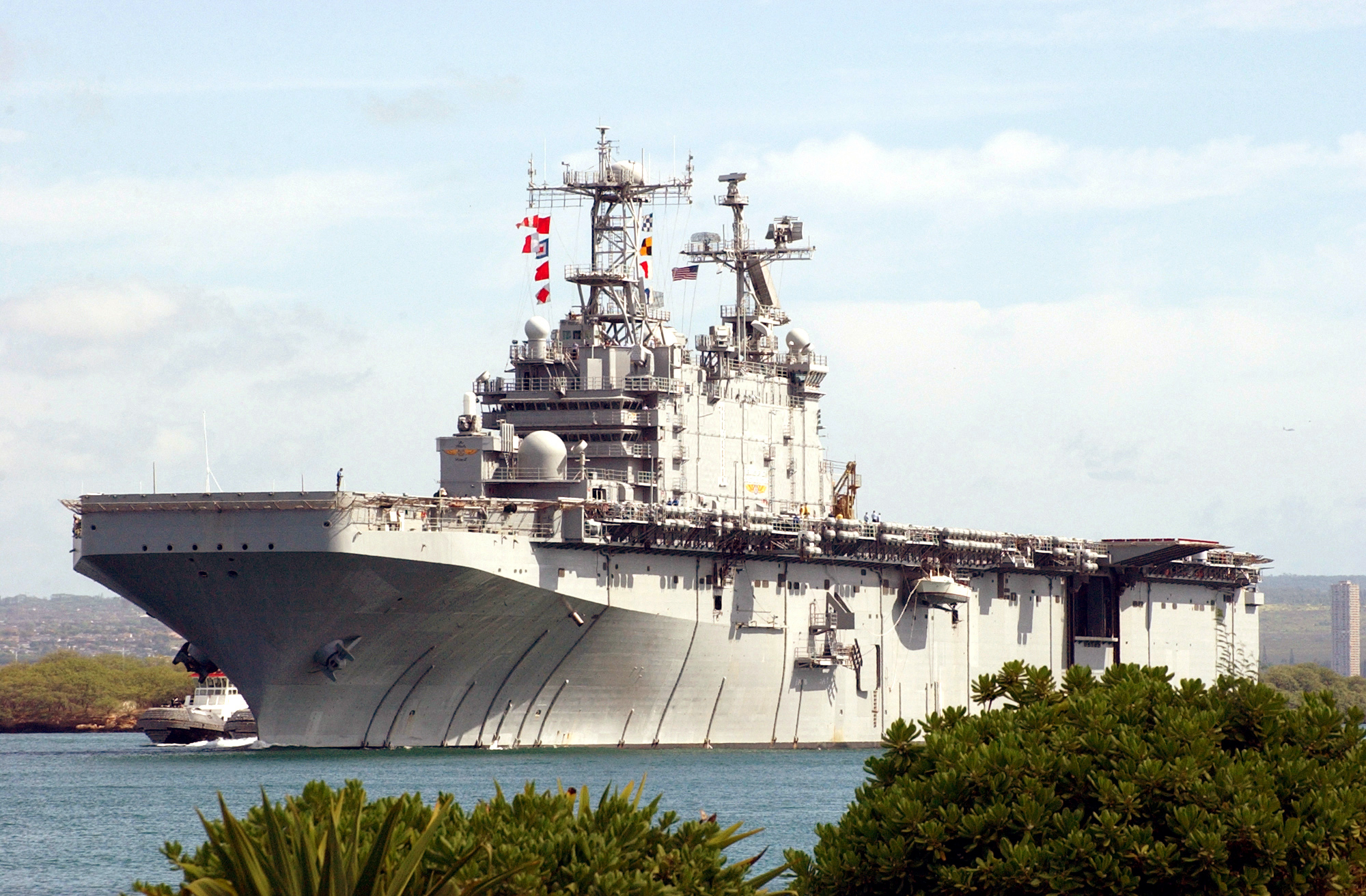
- Tarawa at Pearl Harbor on 28 June 2002

History

United States
- Name: Tarawa
- Namesake: Battle of Tarawa
- Ordered: 1 May 1969
- Builder: Ingalls Shipbuilding
- Laid down: 15 November 1971
- Launched: 1 December 1973
- Sponsored by: Audrey B. Cushman
- Acquired: 14 May 1976
- Commissioned: 29 May 1976
- Decommissioned: 31 March 2009
- Stricken: 30 April 2024
- Home port: San Diego
- Identification: Callsign: NLHA; Hull number: LHA-1
- Motto: Eagle of the Sea
- Fate: Sunk as target, 19 July 2024
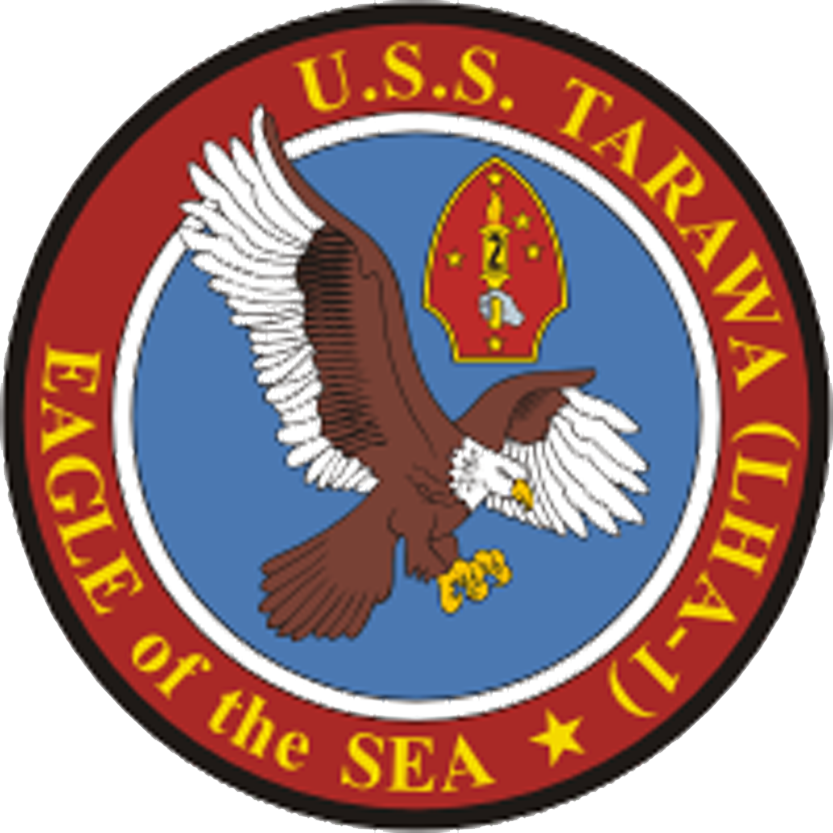
- Badge

General characteristics
- Class & type: Tarawa-class amphibious assault ship
- Displacement: 38,900 tons
- Length: 820 ft (250 m)
- Beam: 106 ft (32 m)
- Draft: 26 ft (7.9 m)
- Speed: 24 knots (44 km/h; 28 mph)
- Troops: 2,000+ Marines
- Complement: 960+ officers and enlisted
- Armament: 4 × Mk 38 Mod 1 25 mm Bushmaster cannons; 5 × M2HB .50-caliber machine guns; 2 × Mk 15 Phalanx (CIWS); 2 × Mk 49 RAM launchers
- Aircraft carried: Up to 35 Helicopters and 8 AV-8B Harrier II VSTOL aircraft

USS Tarawa (LHA-1), the lead ship of her class, was an amphibious assault ship that served in the United States Navy from 1976 to 2009. She was the second ship to be named for the Battle of Tarawa, fought during World War II. Tarawa was decommissioned on 31 March 2009, at San Diego Naval Base.

== History ==
The ship was laid down in November 1971 at Pascagoula, Mississippi, by Ingalls Shipbuilding, launched 1 December 1973, sponsored by Audrey B. Cushman, the wife of Robert E. Cushman, Jr., former Commandant of the Marine Corps, and commissioned on 29 May 1976.

Tarawa was the first of five ships in a new class of general-purpose amphibious assault ships, and combined in one ship type the functions previously performed by four different types: the amphibious assault ship (LPH), the amphibious transport dock (LPD), the amphibious cargo ship (LKA), and the dock landing ship (LSD). She was capable of landing elements of a Marine Corps battalion landing team and their supporting equipment by landing craft, helicopters, or a combination of both.

The ship departed Pascagoula on 7 July 1976 and set a course for the Panama Canal. She transited the canal on 16 July, and after a stop at Acapulco, Mexico, arrived at San Diego, California, on 6 August. During the remainder of 1976, she conducted sea trials, tests, and a shakedown cruise in the Southern California operating area. During the first half of 1977, Tarawa was engaged in training exercises off the California coast. On 13 August, she entered Long Beach Naval Shipyard for post-shakedown availability, which was completed on 15 July 1978. Following four and a half months of intensive individual ship and amphibious refresher training with embarked Marines, Tarawa ended 1978 in her home port of San Diego on Christmas standdown.

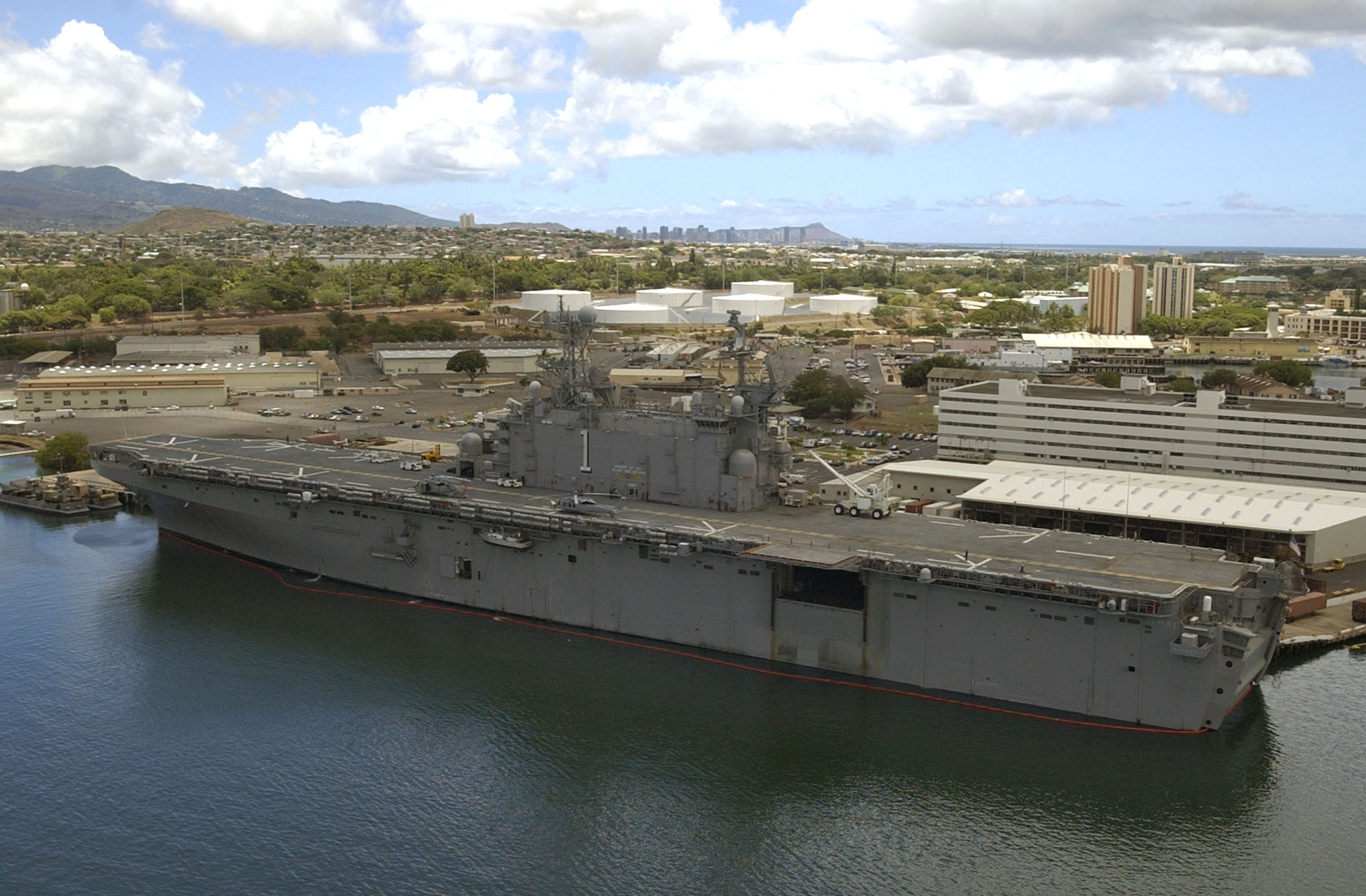
Tarawa portside in Hawaii, 2004

== Missions ==
Her first Western Pacific (WESTPAC) deployment came in 1979, and her memorable actions included port visits to Pearl Harbor; Enewetok, Marshall Islands; Manila and Subic Bay, Republic of the Philippines; South Korea; Singapore; Pattaya; and Okinawa, as well as Hong Kong while it was still under British control. She successfully engaged in experimental launch-and-recovery operations with Marine Corps close-air support AV-8A Harrier jets and later rescued over 400 South Vietnamese refugees adrift in the South China Sea; her corpsmen delivered a baby, Grace Tarawa Tran, during the rescue effort, who returned to a decommissioned Tarawa at Pearl Harbor in 2010 to meet the man who delivered her.

After a second deployment to WESTPAC, beginning in 1980 and spanning into 1981, Tarawa was in the Indian Ocean.

In 1983, during her third deployment, Tarawa went to the Mediterranean to support the United Nations (UN) peacekeepers in Beirut, Lebanon. Several additional cruises followed.

In 1985 as part of the US 7th Fleet, Tarawa participated in Operation Valiant Blitz with the US Marines, 3rd Marine Division. The 1st Battalion, 7th Marine Regiment conducted amphibious-landing and helicopter operations off the coast of Okinawa, including visits to Hong Kong and Subic Bay for liberty call.

In June 1989, Tarawa deployed for a six-month WESTPAC tour as the 11th Marine Expeditionary Unit, composed of the marines from Camp Horno, Camp Pendleton, California, 1st Battalion 9th Marines (redesignated as 2nd Battalion 1st Marines on 9 September 1994).

In December 1990, Tarawa was the flagship of a 13-ship amphibious task force in support of Operation Desert Shield. She participated in the Sea Soldier IV landing exercise in January, which was a deception maneuver suggesting an amphibious assault in Kuwait, and then on 24 February, landed marines in Saudi Arabia just south of the Kuwaiti border.

In May 1991, Tarawa went to Bangladesh in support of Operation Sea Angel, providing humanitarian assistance to victims of a cyclone, delivering rice and water-purification equipment.

In May 1992, Tarawa deployed for the eighth time to WESPAC, participating in Eager Mace 1992–93, a joint U.S./Kuwaiti exercise. The ship also supported the insertion of Pakistani troops into Somalia in support of UN humanitarian relief and returned to San Diego in November 1992. Tarawa was awarded her fourth Admiral Flatley Award and her first Commander, Seventh Fleet, Amphibious Warfare Excellence Award for they deployment. Her 1992 deployment included visits to Hong Kong, Singapore, the Persian Gulf, Somalia, and Australia.

In April 1996, following another complex overhaul at Long Beach Naval Shipyard, Tarawa left from San Diego on her ninth WESPAC deployment. She took part in a US/Thai amphibious-training exercise in the Gulf of Thailand, exercise Indigo Serpent with the Royal Saudi Navy, and exercise Infinite Moonlight, the first exercise between the US and the Royal Jordanian Navy, in the Red Sea. The last preceded Tarawa's visit to the Persian Gulf in support of Operation Southern Watch, enforcing the no-fly zone over southern Iraq. Tarawa was also part of Operation Desert Strike. Returning to San Diego in October 1996, Tarawa earned both the Federal Energy Conservation Award and the Secretary of the Navy Energy Conservation Award.

On 7 February 1998, Tarawa, along with USS Mount Vernon (LSD-39), USS Denver (LPD-9), and more than 4,000 sailors and marines, departed San Diego for a six-month deployment. They departed five days ahead of schedule as part of a buildup of US forces in the Persian Gulf. The Tarawa Amphibious Ready Group (ARG), consisting of more than 2,100 marines from the 11th Marine Expeditionary Unit (MEU), operated in the western Pacific and Indian Oceans and the Persian Gulf. Tarawa conducted special-operations certification exercises before leaving on a 10th deployment to the WESPAC. As the possibility of renewed conflict with Iraq loomed on the horizon, the Tarawa ARG made a dash straight to the Persian Gulf within 31 days, at a speed averaging 17 knots. Just as the ARG neared the Persian Gulf, the threat passed but, according to the commander of Amphibious Group 3, the 12,500-mile, high-speed transit set a record and won the respect of senior Navy officials. The Tarawa ARG and the 11th MEU arrived in the Persian Gulf 11 March 1998. Tarawa, Denver, and Mount Vernon relieved USS Guam (LPH-9) and her ARG to continue the commitment to security and stability in the region. In the early summer of 1998, the ARG conducted an evacuation operation that rescued 250 people from Eritrea's capital, Asmara. The three ships returned home on 7 August after having spent six months deployed to the western Pacific and Indian Oceans and the Persian Gulf.

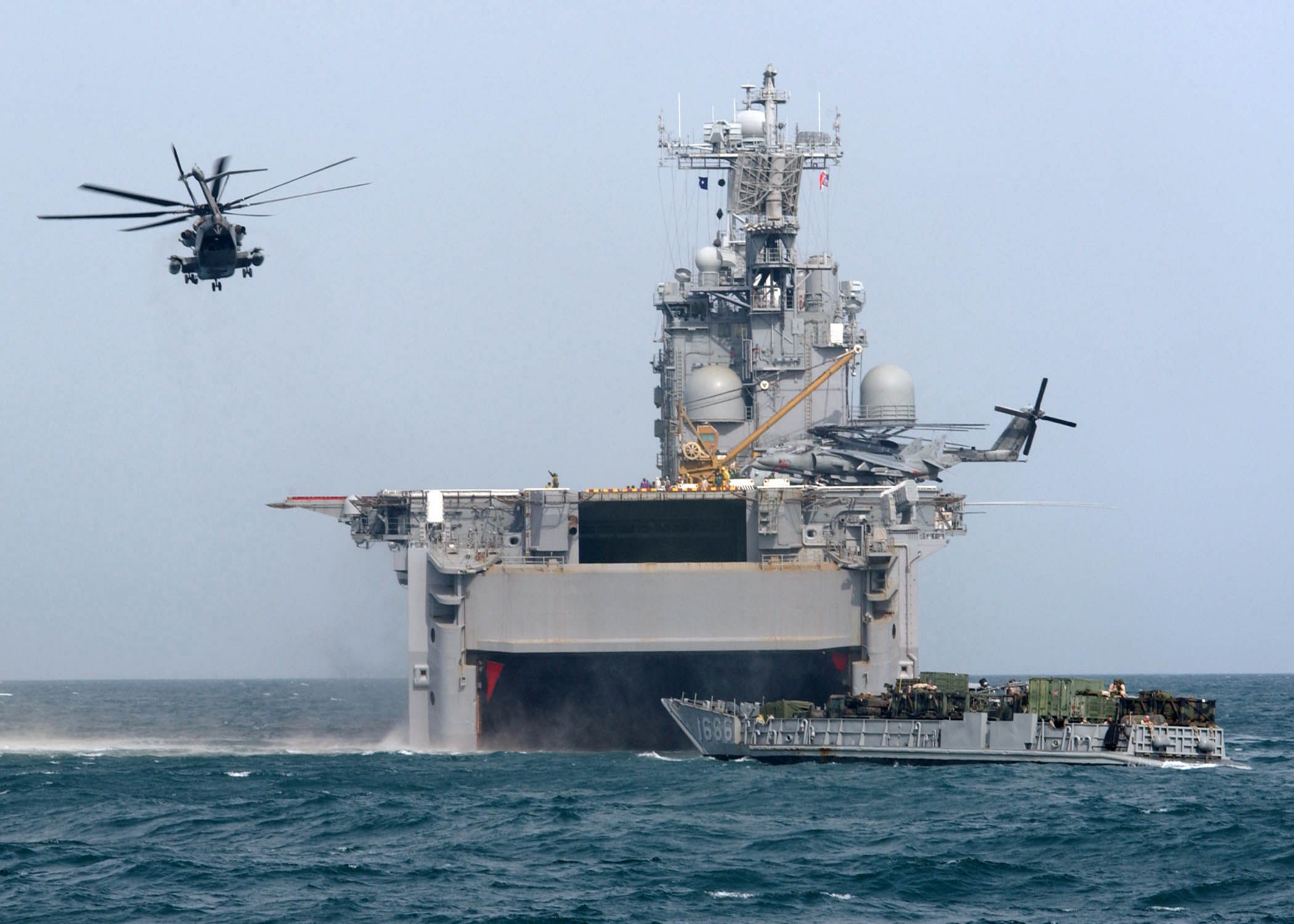
Activity hums around Tarawa, as US Marines go ashore in Kuwait.

In mid-October 2000, Tarawa was passing through the Strait of Hormuz on her way into the Persian Gulf, when the destroyer USS Cole was attacked. On hearing news of the attack, Tarawa came about and steamed full ahead to the Port of Aden in Yemen, where she joined USS Donald Cook, USS Hawes, and the Royal Navy ship HMS Marlborough, already providing logistical support and harbor security, as the command ship in charge of force protection in what became Operation Determined Response. Other US Navy ships involved were Catawba, Camden, Anchorage, and Duluth. Tarawa remained with the damaged Cole until she was secure aboard the Norwegian heavy-lift semisubmersible salvage ship MV Blue Marlin for passage to the US before returning to duty in the Persian Gulf.

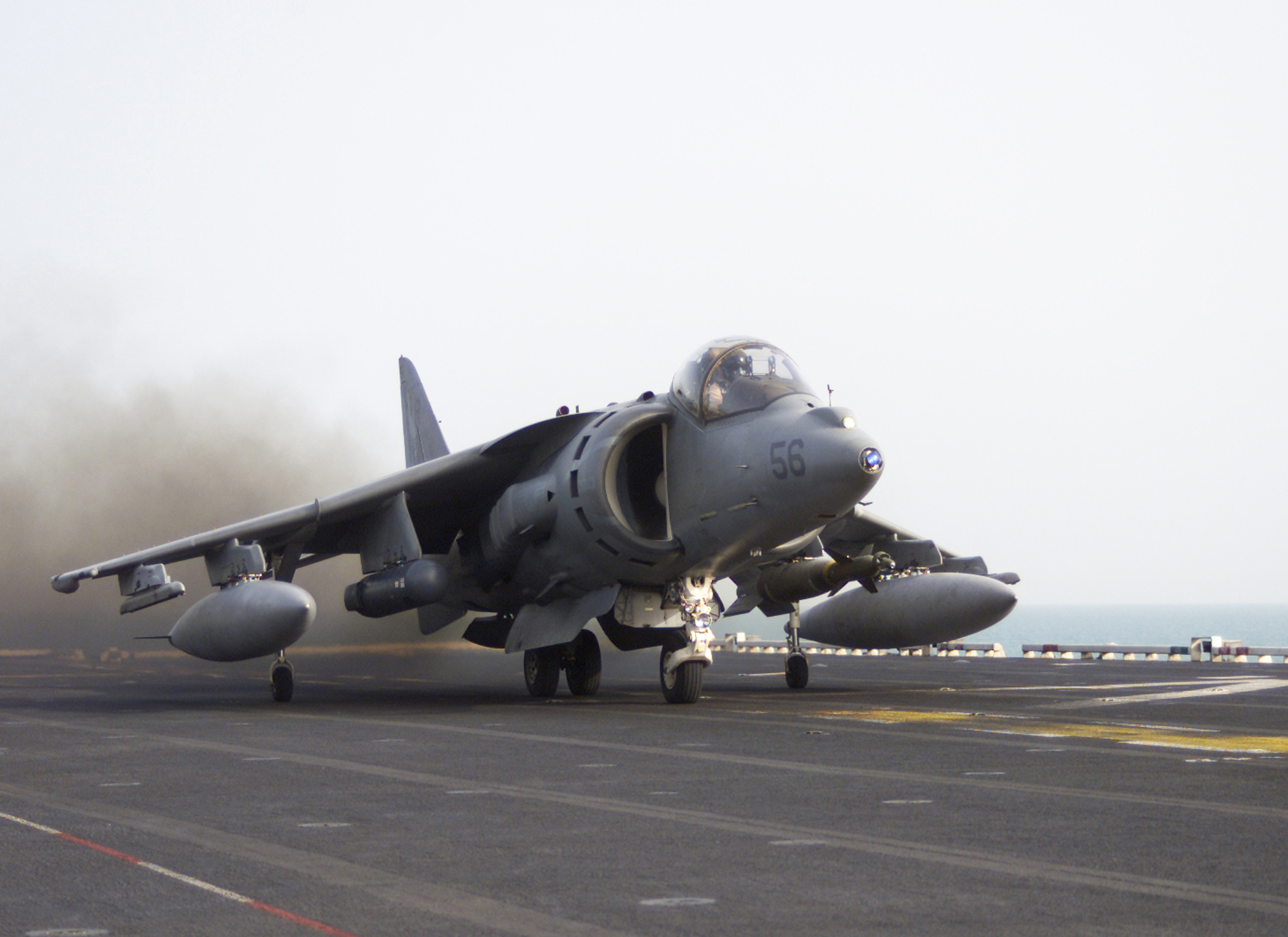
USMC AV-8B Harrier launching from Tarawa in 2003

On 17 January 2001 during her WESTPAC deployment, Tarawa lost her port anchor and chain while visiting Hong Kong. The anchor loss was due to a brake failure during a routine procedure to anchor the ship in Victoria Harbor. Explosive ordnance disposal personnel attached to the ship, who were SCUBA certified, were tasked with locating the anchor and did so. A local barge-crane company was then hired to pull up the anchor, but it ultimately was unsuccessful in relocating the anchor. The Navy used a video of this loss as a training tool to prevent similar incidents.

On 6 January 2003, the Tarawa (ARG), carrying the 15th Marine Expeditionary Unit (MEU/SOC), departed for deployment. In mid-February, elements of the MEU off-loaded and established a training camp in Northern Kuwait, while other members of the MAGTF, primarily the helicopter squadron, remained on board the ARG in the Persian Gulf.

Tarawa deployed from mid-2005 to early 2006 to the Middle East in support of Operation Iraqi Freedom and a multinational training exercise (Operation Bright Star) in Egypt. She transported the 13th MEU. During this deployment, she visited Darwin, Australia; Dubai, UAE; Bahrain; Singapore; and Hong Kong.

She was redeployed to Bangladesh, this time as part of the Cyclone Sidr relief efforts with USS Kearsarge (LHD-3). The code name for the mission was Operations Sea Angel II in recognition of Tarawa's previous support to Bangladesh in 1991. These humanitarian-assistance efforts were instrumental in the ship being awarded the 2007 Battle Efficiency Award.

Her last deployment was from 7 November 2007 to 8 June 2008, with the 11th MEU, composed of 1st Battalion, 5th Marines Charlie and Weapons company, in the Middle East in support of operations Iraqi Freedom and Enduring Freedom. She returned to her home port of San Diego, finishing a seven-month deployment. She visited Bangladesh for a third time to offer aid for tsunami victims, Singapore, Bahrain, the UAE, Djibouti, Perth and Hobart, Australia, and Hawaii.

== Fate ==
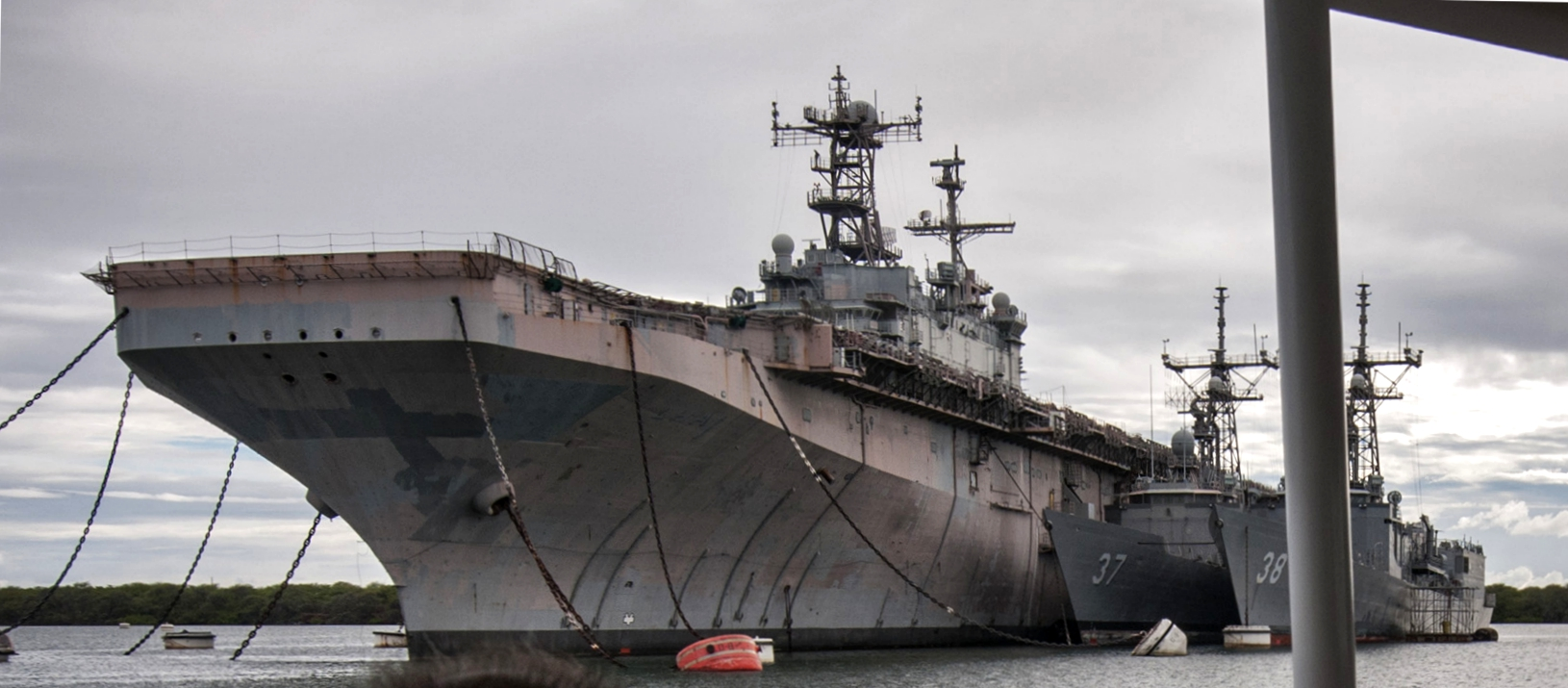
Ex-Tarawa laid up at Pearl Harbor, 2013.

Tarawa was decommissioned on March 31, 2009 and was transferred by the USNS Salvor to the Naval Inactive Ship Maintenance Facility at Middle Loch, Pearl Harbor. According to FY2011 plans, two Tarawa-class ships were in Category B Reserve to satisfy Marine Sealift Requirements.

In July 2014, the US Naval Amphibious Ship Historical Society was formed by members of Tarawa's original commissioning crew, also known as plankowners, with plans to make her the first Navy amphibious-ship museum. The organization was planning to acquire the ship and give her a permanent home on the West Coast as a museum.

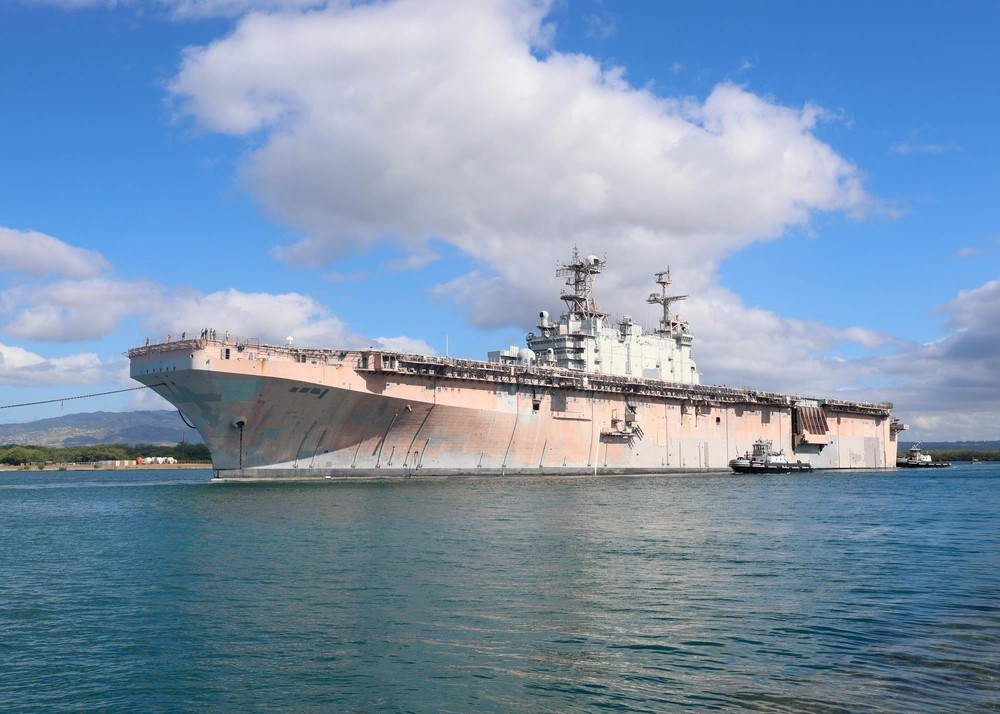
Ex-Tarawa towed to be sunk for RIMPAC 2024

Tarawa was stricken from the Naval Registry on 30 April 2024, and on 19 July 2024, was sunk off the coast of Hawaii during RIMPAC 2024. A number of ships and aircraft from several countries participated in the sinking. Tarawa was the largest ship of her class to be sunk during a live-fire naval exercise involving US forces since USS Belleau Wood in 2006.

Tarawa specially was hit by an AGM-158C LRASM from an F/A-18F Super Hornet.
