= USS Fort Fisher =

US Navy dock landing ship

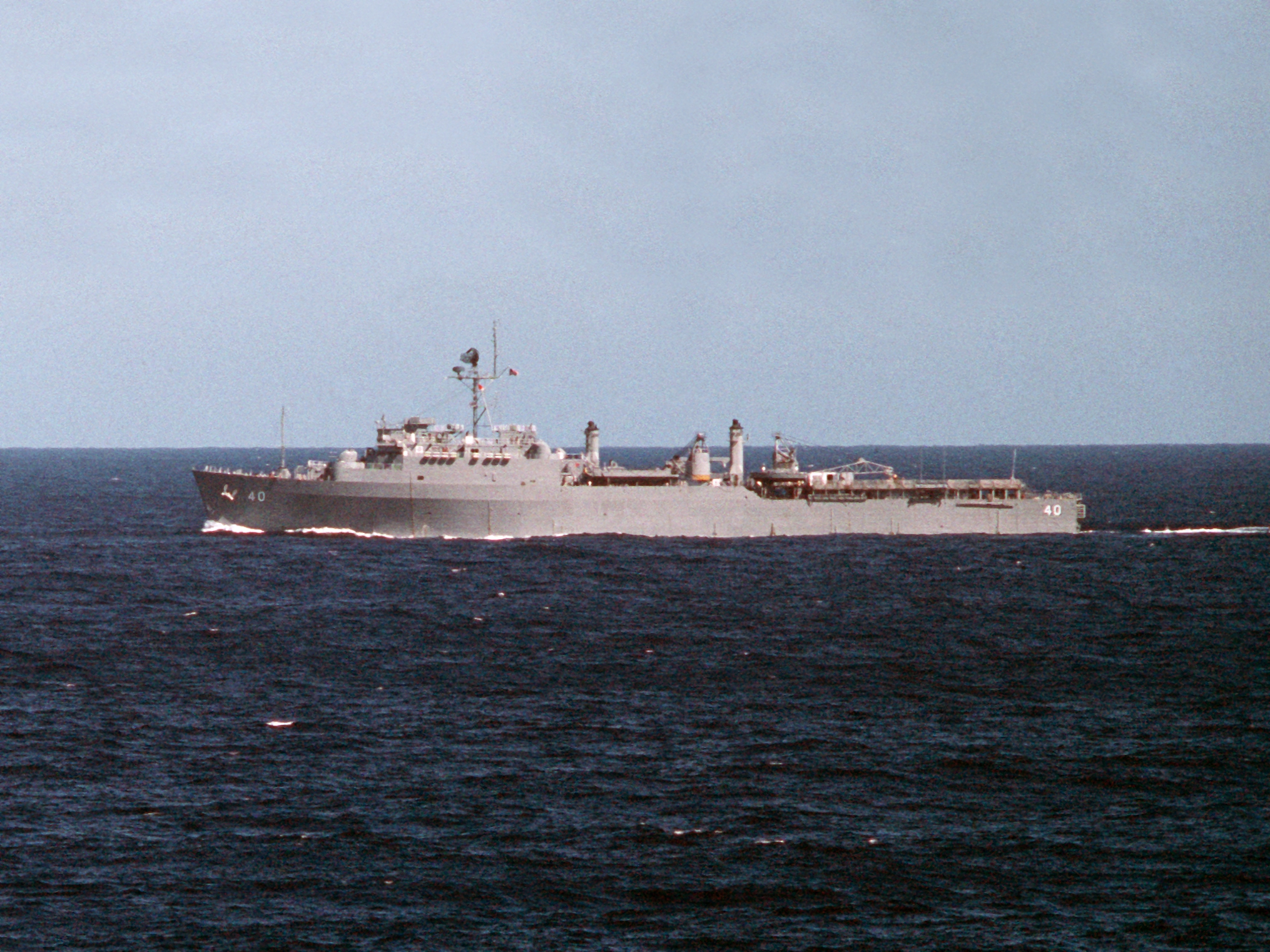

History

United States
- Name: USS Fort Fisher
- Namesake: Fort Fisher in North Carolina
- Awarded: 2 May 1967
- Builder: General Dynamics, Quincy, Massachusetts
- Laid down: 15 July 1970
- Launched: 22 April 1972
- Acquired: 8 November 1972
- Commissioned: 9 December 1972
- Decommissioned: 27 February 1998
- Stricken: 27 February 1998
- Motto: "Support from sea to shore"
- Fate: Sold for scrapping, 30 September 2009

General characteristics
- Class & type: Anchorage-class dock landing ship
- Tonnage: 5,440 DWT
- Displacement: 8,762 long tons (8,903 t) light; 14,202 long tons (14,430 t) full
- Length: 553 ft (169 m) o/a; 540 ft (160 m) w/l
- Beam: 84 ft (26 m)
- Draft: 20 ft (6.1 m) (max navigational draft)
- Propulsion: Steam turbines, two propellers
- Speed: 22 knots (41 km/h; 25 mph)
- Boats & landing craft carried: 3 × LCAC
- Troops: 330 Marines
- Complement: 18 officers, 340 enlisted
- Armament: 2 × 20mm Phalanx CIWS; 2 × Mk.38 machine guns; 4 × 0.5 in (12.7 mm) guns
- Aviation facilities: Helipad
- Notes: Steel hull, steel superstructure.

USS Fort Fisher (LSD-40) was an Anchorage-class dock landing ship in service with the United States Navy from 1972 to 1998. She was scrapped in 2010.

== Service history ==
Fort Fisher was laid down on 15 July 1970 at General Dynamics Quincy Shipbuilding Division and launched on 22 April 1972. She was commissioned on 9 December 1972.

Fort Fisher was first homeported at Long Beach, California, before moving to San Diego in August 1973. The ship made her first overseas deployment as part of Amphibious Forces, United States Seventh Fleet, in the first half of 1974, the first of ten deployments to the Western Pacific, as well as three to the Persian Gulf. Fort Fisher was refitted between September 1986 and May 1987, in order to operate the Navy's new Landing Craft Air Cushion (LCAC). In September 1994, Fort Fisher was sent to Somalia as part of the multinational Unified Task Force bringing humanitarian aid in Operation Restore Hope. She returned there on 8 February 1995, and took part in Operation United Shield, the withdrawal of troops and equipment. On her final deployment in 1997 Fort Fisher took part in joint exercises with Persian Gulf nations.

Fort Fisher was decommissioned on 27 February 1998 and struck from the Naval Vessel Registry on the same day. On 30 September 2009, a contract to dismantle Fort Fisher was issued to International Shipbreaking Ltd. of Brownsville, Texas. Fort Fisher departed the Suisun Bay Reserve Fleet on 5 January 2010 under tow to Brownsville. Fort Fisher completed her dismantling on 14 January 2011.
