= USS Pensacola (LSD-38) =

1970 Anchorage-class dock landing ship

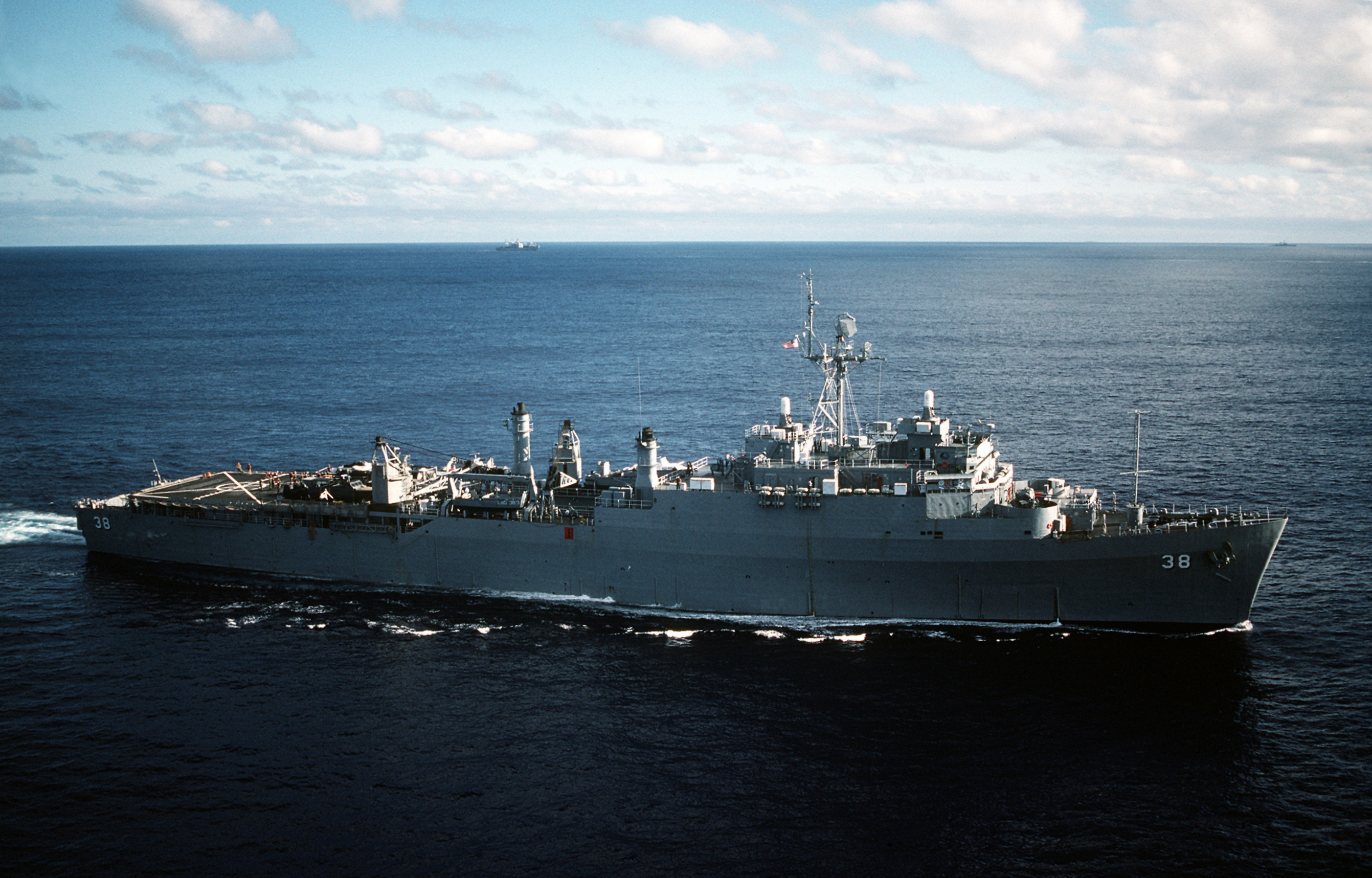
- USS Pensacola

History

United States
- Name: USS Pensacola
- Namesake: Pensacola, Florida
- Awarded: 25 February 1966
- Builder: Fore River Shipyard
- Laid down: 12 March 1969
- Launched: 11 July 1970
- Commissioned: 27 March 1971
- Decommissioned: 30 September 1999
- Stricken: 30 September 1999
- Fate: Sold to the Republic of China, 30 September 1999

Taiwan
- Name: ROCS Hsu Hai (LSD-193)
- Namesake: Xuhai
- Acquired: 30 September 1999
- Commissioned: June 2000
- Status: In service

General characteristics
- Class & type: Anchorage-class dock landing ship
- Displacement: 14,000 long tons (14,000 t) full load
- Length: 553 ft (169 m)
- Beam: 85 ft (26 m)
- Draft: 18 ft (5.5 m)
- Propulsion: 2 × steam turbines; 2 × boilers, 600 psi (4.1 MPa); 2 shafts
- Speed: 22 knots (25 mph; 41 km/h)
- Range: 14,800 nm at 12 knots
- Boats & landing craft carried: well deck size: 131.06 m × 15.24 m for 3 LCACs or 50 AAV7
- Capacity: vehicle garage (1,115 m^{2}), on upper deck: 2 LCM(6), on davits: 1 LCVP, and 1 LCPL
- Troops: 330 man Marine detachment
- Complement: 18 officers, 340–345 enlisted
- Armament: 2 × 20 mm Phalanx CIWS; 2 × Mk-38 machine guns; 4 × 0.5 in (12.7 mm) machine guns

USS Pensacola (LSD-38) was an Anchorage-class dock landing ship of the United States Navy. She was the fourth Navy ship to be named for the naval town of Pensacola, Florida. She was built at Fore River Shipyard in Quincy, Massachusetts, and commissioned in 1971. She was transferred to the Republic of China Navy in 1999 and is currently named ROCS Hsu Hai.

== Operational history ==
In early 1995, the Commanding Officer of USS Pensacola was relieved because the preceding November, the ship had run aground off the East Coast. In 1995, while cruising in the Mediterranean, the ship suffered a major fuel leak, causing the ship to go to General Quarters. The fuel leak was repaired, and no one was injured. In 1996, USS Pensacola ran aground once again while en route to Newport, Rhode Island. During the 1996 deployment, assisted in the non-combatant evacuation of Albania. During 1999 deployment stood guard during the events that lead to the invasion of Kosovo.

== Transfer to Taiwan ==
Pensacola was finally decommissioned in 1999, transferred to the Republic of China Navy (ROCN) in Taiwan and redesignated ROCS Hsu Hai (LSD-193).
