= USS Duluth (LPD-6) =

United States Navy amphibious transport dock

Coordinates: 21.379787°N 157.988859°W

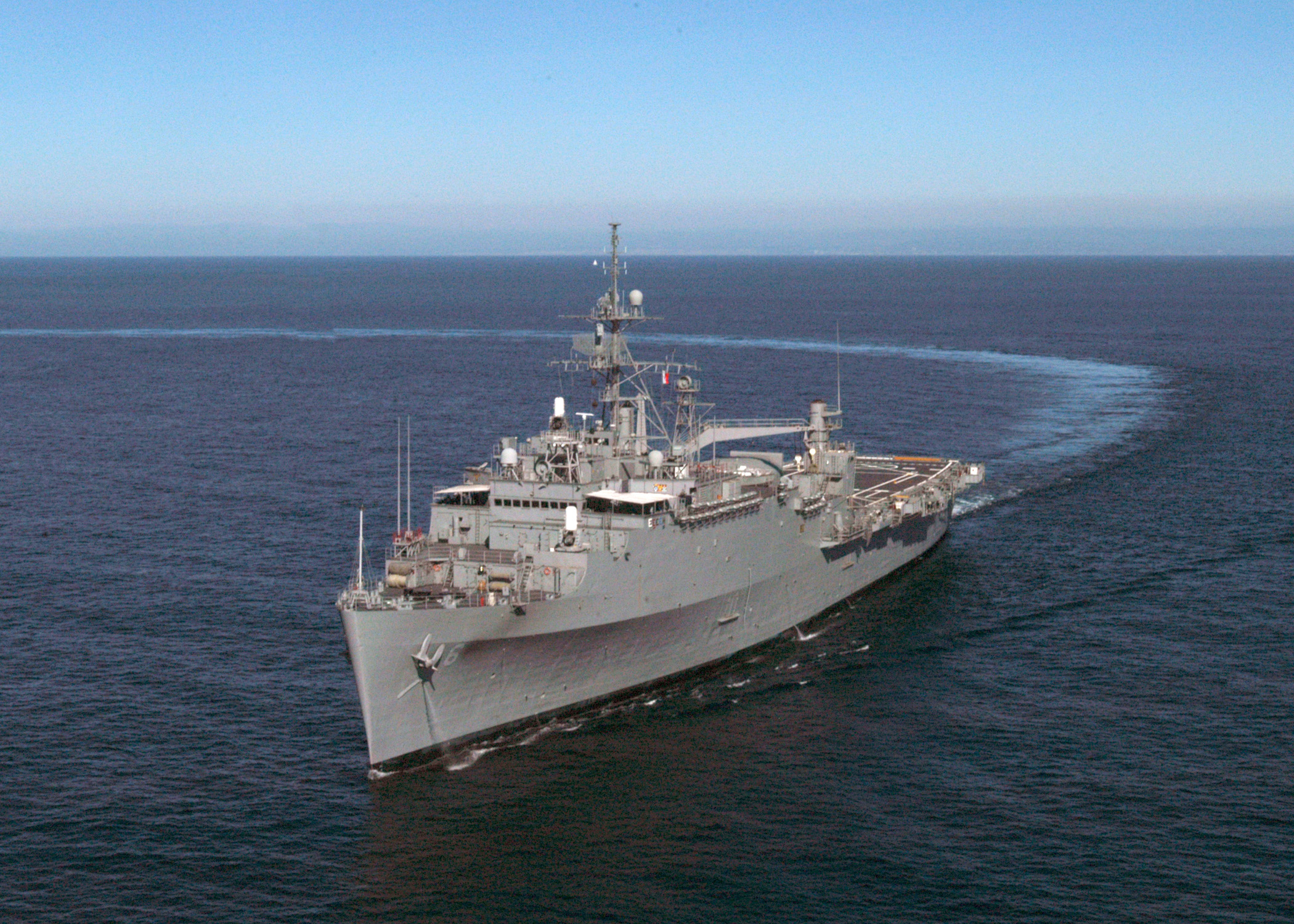
- USS Duluth in 2004

History

United States
- Name: Duluth
- Namesake: Duluth, Minnesota
- Ordered: 21 September 1961
- Laid down: 18 December 1963
- Launched: 14 August 1965
- Commissioned: 18 December 1965
- Decommissioned: 13 October 2005
- Stricken: 28 September 2005
- Home port: San Diego, California
- Identification: Hull number: LPD-6
- Motto: Official: Fortiter in Re ("Bold in Action"); Unofficial: "6 the Hard Way"
- Nickname(s): Dirty D or the Battle Pig or Dulucifier-"A billion dead spirits with hammers of hell pass through the waters ringing evils bell".
- Fate: Scrapped in 2014
- Notes: One of the anchors is now in Duluth, Minnesota on display.
- Badge: USS Duluth insignia

General characteristics
- Class & type: Austin-class amphibious transport dock
- Displacement: 9,201 long tons (9,349 t) light; 13,914 long tons (14,137 t) full load
- Length: 568 ft 11 in (173.4 m) overall; 547 ft 11 in (167 m) waterline
- Beam: 107 ft 11 in (32.9 m) extreme; 84 ft 0 in (25.6 m) waterline
- Draft: 22 ft 0 in (6.7 m) maximum
- Speed: 20 knots (37 km/h; 23 mph)
- Troops: about 600
- Complement: 101 officers, 1,337 enlisted

USS Duluth (LPD-6), an Austin-class amphibious transport dock, was the second ship of the United States Navy named for the city in Minnesota.

Duluth was laid down on 18 December 1963 by the New York Naval Shipyard. She was launched on 14 August 1965 and commissioned on 18 December 1965. She was the last ship to be launched from the Brooklyn Navy Yard before it was closed.

== History ==
=== 1965–1970 ===
The ship left New York Naval Shipyard, Brooklyn, in April 1966 for the US Naval Shipyard Philadelphia for final fitting out and preparation for refresher training and transit to its Home Port of US Naval Station San Diego, California. On 15 June 1966, a Sikorsky H-34 from HC-4 made the first helicopter landing on board. Duluth arrived via the Panama Canal in San Diego in September 1966. In April 1967 ship sailed via Hawaii and Australia to join the Amphibious Ready Group, U.S. 7th Fleet in the Vietnam War.

In 1967, from the months of May until November Duluth operated with Amphibious Ready Group, Seventh Fleet, in South China Sea. Conducted amphibious landing operations Bear Claw and Beacon Guide at Huế (7 June), Chu Lai (12 June), Cửa Việt Base (3, 27 July) and Phú Lộc (21 July). Took part in Operations Beacon Gate at Song Cua Dai and Chu Lai ( 7–16 August) and Beacon Point off Thừa Thiên Province. The LPD then steamed off Quảng Nam and Quảng Tín Provinces during Operation Ballistic Charge (16–28 September). After refitting at U.S. Naval Base Subic Bay, Duluth participated in helicopter-centered Operation Bastion Hill near Cửa Việt (10 October – 1 November). Following vehicle ferry operations from Subic early in the month, the LPD steamed to Hong Kong, arriving there 17 November.

Underway for a WestPac cruise on 1 May 1970, Duluth loaded BLT 1st Battalion, 9th Marines at Okinawa for transfer to Subic Bay at the end of the month. She then made several cargo lifts to Da Nang or to Yankee Station, delivering an H-3 helicopter to USS America, spare parts, and carried YFU-52 back to Subic Bay before steaming to United States Fleet Activities Sasebo, Japan, for rest and recreation 3–15 July. Returning to Subic on 19 July, she spent the next three months conducting amphibious training and logistics operations from Subic to Da Nang and Vũng Tàu. In mid-October, Duluth embarked 140 Philippine marines for a joint exercise near Manila, but disaster recovery efforts in the wake of Typhoon Joan forced a cancellation of the operation. Arriving in Lagoney Gulf on 22 October, Duluth operated as a fuel stop and ready deck ship for helicopters during three days of relief operations in a swath of devastated barrios and villages 80 by 20 miles (32 km) wide and including the cities of Virac and Naga. Following another month of logistics support out of Subic Bay, Duluth steamed for home, reaching San Diego on 10 December.

=== 1971–1975 ===
After a restricted availability to repair a damaged rotor blade in her port turbine, Duluth sailed for another WestPac deployment on 1 October 1971. The ship loaded elements of BLT 2nd Battalion, 4th Marines at Okinawa on 18 October before resuming Da Nang logistics support operations out of Subic Bay. The LPD delivered vehicles, equipment and humanitarian supplies to Da Nang and embarked deck cargo and damaged PTFs for return to Subic. The LPD remained there until through the winter, conducting the occasional amphibious exercise in the Philippines and transporting troops and supplies between Subic Bay and Buckner Bay. On 1 April, following the outbreak of the North Vietnamese Easter Offensive, Duluth sailed to a holding station off South Vietnam to await developments. With the North Vietnamese offensive blunted by the end of the month, the LPD steamed to Subic Bay for rest and relaxation, 8–21 May. Returning to Vietnam, Duluth embarked 300 South Vietnamese marines at Tan My and landed them in Quảng Trị Province on the 24th, during which operation Duluth took desultory enemy fire from a shore battery. The LPD conducted a similar mission in early July, when Marine helicopters deployed South Vietnamese marines during Operation Lam-Son 72, before sailing for home on 14 July and arriving in San Diego on 4 August 1972.

On 28 March 1975, Duluth got underway for a WestPac deployment via Pearl Harbor, Okinawa and Subic Bay. Arriving off Vũng Tàu on 21 April, Duluth participated in Operation Frequent Wind, the evacuation of Saigon, Vietnam. Among the ship's crew during the operation was lithographer's mate David Naleski, who later became a trade union shop steward at the Plum Island Animal Disease Center. On 29 April, fourteen South Vietnamese, Marine and Air America helicopters landed delivering over 900 refugees to Duluth alone, including the Italian ambassador. The refugees were later transferred to USNS Sgt. Truman Kimbro. The following day another 1,391 refugees arrived, forcing Duluth's crew to jettison three Republic of Vietnam Air Force helicopters over the side to make room for the arriving CH-53 helicopters. The ship then steamed to Subic Bay and disembarked the refugees on 5 May. Over the next four days, working parties of volunteers reported to Grande Island to assist and process refugees. The LPD was reassigned to the task force heading to Cambodia to participate in the rescue operation of SS Mayaguez. Duluth was approaching her mission when the rescue operation was cancelled before the second wave could strike. They steamed back to Subic Bay to continue with assisting and processing of the South Vietnamese refugees.

=== 1982 ===
In March, Duluth participated as one of many amphibious ships in Operation Team Spirit '82. This was a joint training exercise between the U.S. Navy/U.S. Marine Corps and the forces of South Korea. Her specific mission was to transport the 1st Battalion, 1st Marines from Okinawa to South Korea and back. There was also a training evolution in support of a U.S. Marine Corps AV-8 Harrier unit. This involved landing and refueling some of the jets on the flight deck. During the transit to South Korea, Duluth was over flown by a Soviet Tu-95 Bear while in international waters.

=== 1981 ===
Duluth sailed on 12 November 1981 for a Westpac/Indian Ocean deployment as part of Amphibious Ready Group Alpha/Amphibious Squadron One (USS Tripoli, USS Mount Vernon, USS Fresno and MAU 31st/HMM-265 'Flying Tigers' (REIN)) during which USS Duluth and Amphibious Squadron One visited Fremantle, Western Australia for R&R from 28 January to 3 February 1982. USS Duluth returned home on 15 May 1982

=== 1983 ===
In August, September and October 1983 Duluth served in support of the multi-national peace keeping mission to Beirut, Lebanon, and participated in the evacuation of Ambassador Robert Collins and family.

=== 1987 ===
In June Duluth embarked 1st Battalion 9th Marines, from Camp Pendleton, California, as Battalion Landing Team One Slant Nine and set out on its six-month WestPac tour. The official deployment was designated as the 13th MAU SOC (Marine Amphibious Unit, Special Operations Capable). Included in this deployment were USS Tripoli, USS Germantown, USS Durham and USS Frederick. Aboard Germantown, LCAC's (Landing Craft Air Cushion) 2, 3 and 4 were carried. It was the first time that the LCACs were deployed in support of Naval and Marine Corps operations. Several Humanitarian missions were executed in the Philippines and Indonesia. Marines were also deployed to the Mediterranean to assault several terrorist-held oil rigs. The Marines were also called upon to restore order and security around the Subic Naval Base after several "Sparrow teams" killed high ranking government officials in an attempted coup. The ship received a Battle "E" and the Marines a Meritorious Unit Citation for actions throughout the deployment.

=== 1989–1994 ===
In January 1989 Duluth sailed on a WestPac cruise with MSSG-13 and SEAL Team 5 embarked. In addition to port calls in Okinawa, the Philippines, Japan and Hong Kong, Duluth participated in Team Spirit 89 in Korea. In late May after operations with the Australian Army and Navy, Duluth's port call in Mackay, Australia was cut short when the Amphibious Ready Group she was attached to was recalled "at best possible speed" across the Pacific to the evolving situation in Panama. She returned to San Diego in early June. In August 1989, Duluth sailed to Prince William Sound, Alaska, for oil spill decontamination operations with HMM-268 embarked. Duluth housed clean-up crews, provided medical and weather forecasting services and supported decontamination barge efforts.

Duluth was underway 21 January 1994 for WestPac operations. Arrived in Singapore 14 February and assigned to TG 76.5 for duty off the coast of Somalia. The ship remained in Singapore for six days before getting underway for the Indian Ocean and arriving off Mogadishu on 3 March to assist in the evacuation of American forces from Somalia. She remained there, other than a short trip to Melindi, Kenya, until 24 April when the LPD steamed to Mombasa. Duluth then steamed off Kipini, Kenya, holding for possible contingency operations owing to the civil war in Rwanda, until 4 June when she sailed for Fremantle, Western Australia. Following a five-day port visit, the LPD returned to San Diego via Pearl Harbor, arriving home on 21 July.

=== 1996–1997 ===
During the deployment, Duluth participated with the other ships of COMPHIBRON Three and 13th MEU in a highly classified operation to capture Imad Mughniyah. This plan, Operation Return Ox, set sail at 1730C from Bahrain on 23 July 1996 to intercept the motor vessel Ibn Tufail, a Pakistani ship on which it was believed Mughniyah was embarked. On 24 July, after all ships were at sea and Navy SEALs had already begun shadowing the Pakistani ship, it was canceled. Operators were told that the White House canceled the interception when they could not be given 100% assurance that Mughniya was actually on board.

=== 2000–2005 ===
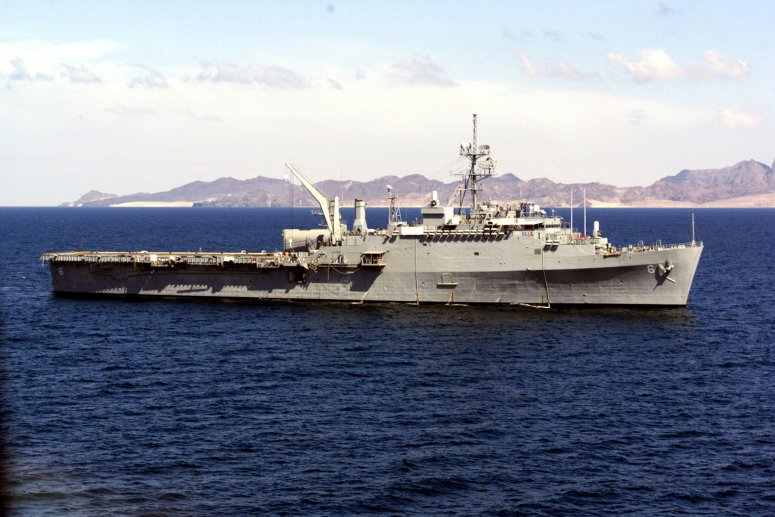
USS Duluth seen here off the coast of Aden, Yemen, 29 January 2000.

Duluth was again underway 14 August 2000 for operations in the Indian Ocean as part of the USS Tarawa Amphibious Ready Group (ARG). Following stops at Pearl Harbor and Darwin, Australia, Duluth conducted three days of humanitarian assistance operations off East Timor ( 14–16 September) before a one-day stop at Singapore on 21 September. Moving into the Indian Ocean, the ARG stopped at Phuket, Thailand (28 September – 1 October) before steaming on to the Seychelles, where they arrived 9 October. Three days later, Duluth received word that USS Cole had been bombed in harbor at Aden, Yemen, and the LPD quickly steamed north to Aden to provide small boat and helicopter operations in support of Cole. Following a short cruise north to Bahrain in late December, Duluth sailed east, arriving in San Diego on 14 February. While en route, the LPD stopped at Iwo Jima to launch amphibious vehicles in commemoration of the World War II battle.

Underway for Operation Iraqi Freedom on 6 January 2003, Duluth loaded elements of the 15th Marine Expeditionary Unit and HMM-161 and sailed west. After a brief stop in Singapore on 29 January, the ships sailed into the Indian Ocean and arrived in the northern Persian Gulf on 10 February. The LPD operated at sea until 19 March when hostilities began in Iraq. The ship served as on-scene commander on 22 March when two helicopters from HMS Ark Royal collided in the vicinity of Duluth. After the initial surge of Marines ashore, Duluth's crew conducted boat operations in support of operations around Iraqi oil pipeline terminals. Departing the Persian Gulf on 27 May, the ship stopped at Cairns, Australia and Pearl Harbor before arriving home on 23 July.

While anchored at Guam on 28 December 2004, the LPD was ordered south for Operation Unified Assistance to aid victims of the devastating Indian Ocean tsunami. Duluth arrived off Sri Lanka on 9 January 2005 and her crew and embarked Marines cleared helicopter landing zones, removed debris and helped clean up two devastated elementary schools. During this deployment, Duluth delivered 210 tons of supplies to Sumatra and Sri Lanka.

The amphibious transport dock ship's last deployment ended in June 2005 after a six-month cruise to the Persian Gulf in support of Operation Iraqi Freedom.

Shortly after Duluth's final cruise, she was decommissioned at Naval Station San Diego in a ceremony on 28 September 2005 and LPD-6 was stripped from the national ship's registry. The ceremony featured the crew leaving the ship in ranks and the lowering of the national colors.

Duluth sat in San Diego for many months before being towed to the mothball fleet in Hawaii. She was towed to Brownsville, Texas, in January 2014 for disposal. A team of former crew members, including two former commanding officers, boarded the ship prior to scrapping for final photographs and collection of mementos. The items removed are now in Duluth, Minnesota, at a museum. One of the anchors is also on display in Duluth.

== Awards ==
Duluth won many awards in its 39 years. The most recent was the Coast Guard Meritorious Unit Award for supporting Coast Guard Port Security Units during Operation Iraqi Freedom from March to May 2003. Two Coast Guard units, PSUs 311 and 313, were assigned to defend the ABOT and KAAOT gas oil platforms (OPLATS) off the Iraqi coast after their seizure during the opening nights of Operation Iraqi Freedom. Duluth provided the Coast Guard detachments support by performing significant repairs to platform power sources, quality of life upgrades, command and control system repairs and improvements. More recently Duluth was awarded the Humanitarian Service Medal for tsunami relief efforts in the Sri Lanka area.
