= USS Portland (LSD-37) =

US Navy Anchorage-class dock landing ship

Coordinates: 34°55′48.9″N 70°14′56.3″W

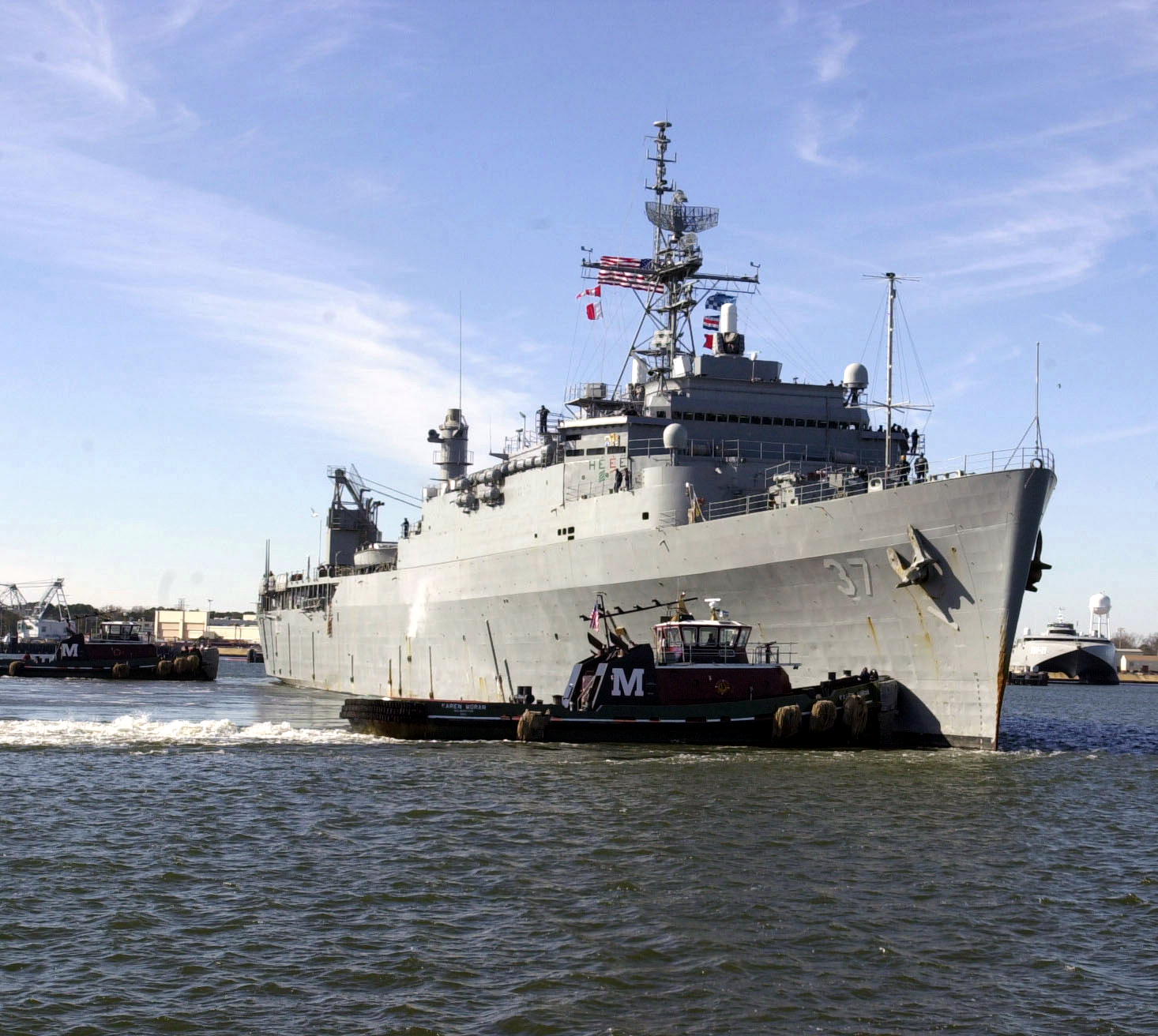
- Portland stands out of the harbor at the Naval Amphibious Base Little Creek, Virginia, 2003

History

United States
- Name: Portland
- Namesake: Portland, Maine; Portland, Oregon
- Ordered: 25 February 1966
- Laid down: 5 May 1968
- Launched: 20 December 1969
- Commissioned: 3 October 1970
- Decommissioned: 4 August 2003
- Stricken: 8 March 2004
- Nickname(s): Sweet Pea
- Fate: Sunk as a target, 25 April 2004

General characteristics
- Displacement: 14,181 long tons (14,409 t)
- Length: 553 ft (169 m)
- Beam: 84 ft (26 m)
- Draft: 20 ft (6.1 m)
- Propulsion: 2 shafts; 2 turbines; two 600 psi (4.1 MPa) boilers
- Speed: 22 knots
- Complement: 26 officers and 396 enlisted
- Armament: 8 × 3 in guns, 2 CIWS; 4 × .50 calibre guns

The second USS Portland was a US Navy Anchorage class dock landing ship built at General Dynamics Quincy Shipbuilding Division at Quincy, Massachusetts, and commissioned in 1970. Portland was decommissioned in 2003 and stricken from the Naval Vessel Register in 2004. It was sunk as a target during an exercise off the Virginia coast later that year.

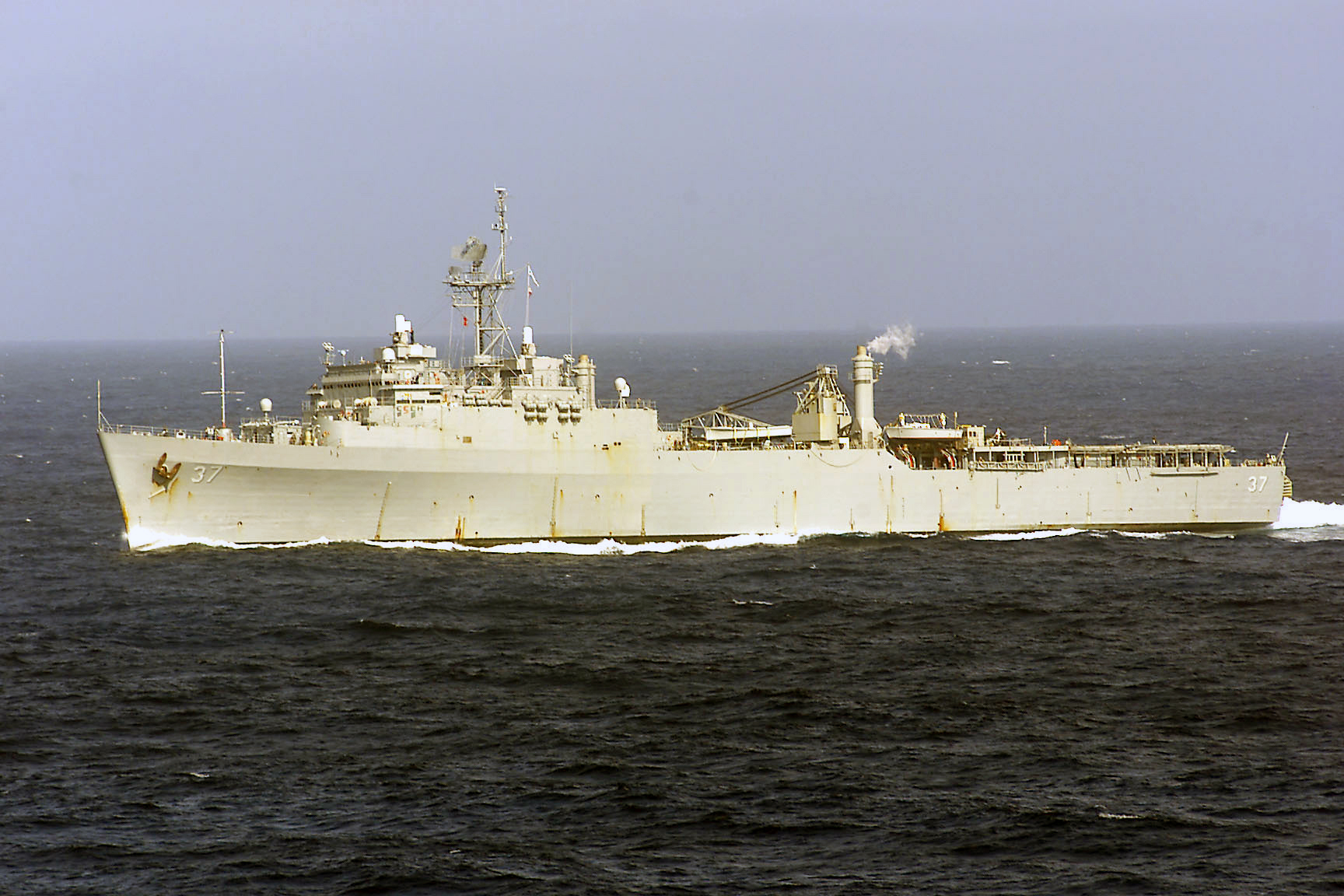

== Bibliography ==
- Friedman, Norman (1995). "United Kingdom". In Chumbley, Stephen (ed.). Conway's All The World's Fighting Ships 1947–1995. Annapolis, Maryland: Naval Institute Press. pp. 544–634. ISBN 1-55750-132-7.
