= Anchorage-class dock landing ship =

Series of ships in the US Navy

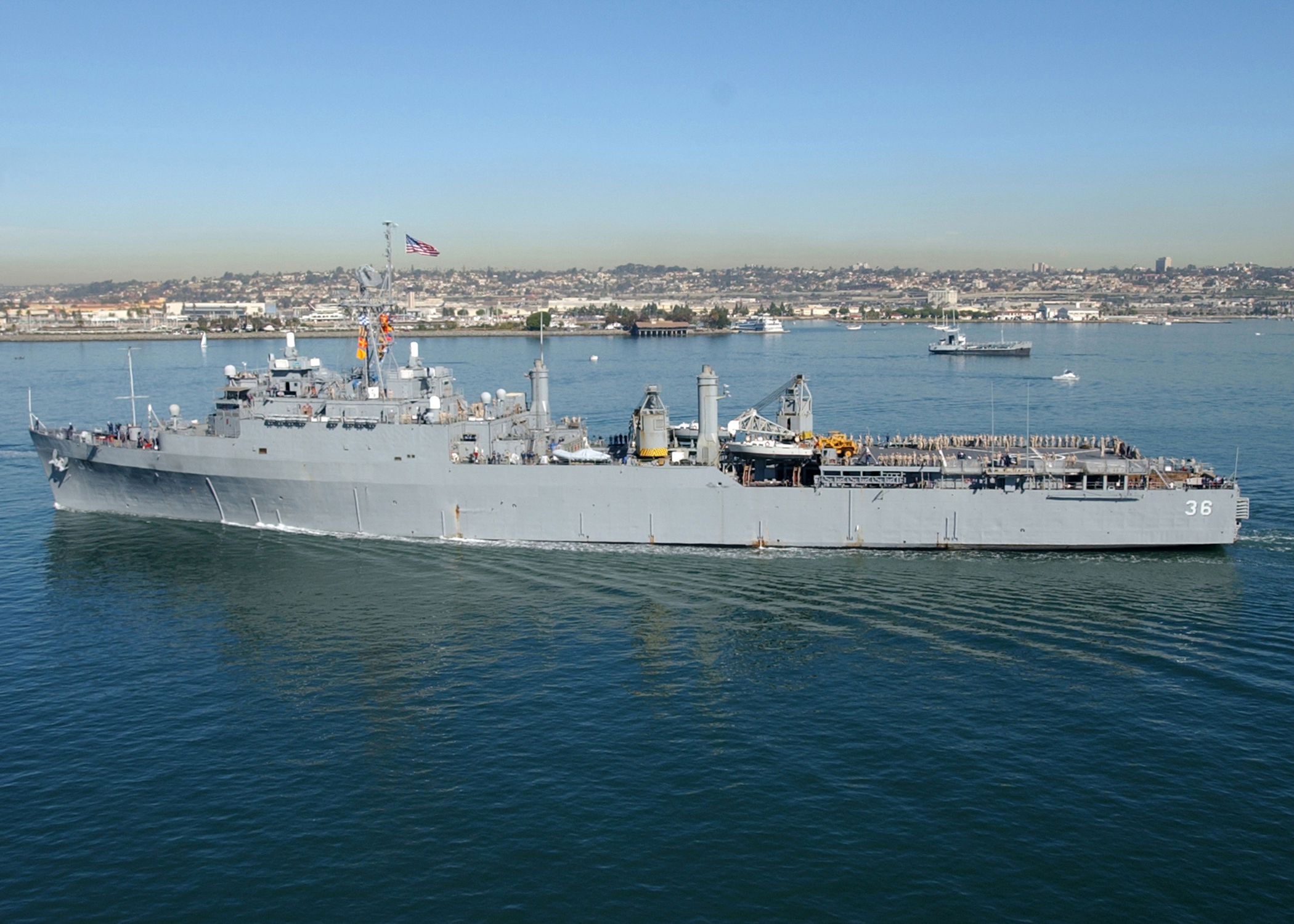
- USS Anchorage (LSD-36)

Class overview
- Operators: United States Navy; Republic of China Navy
- Preceded by: Thomaston-class dock landing ship
- Succeeded by: Whidbey Island-class dock landing ship
- Built: 1967–1972
- In commission: 1969– Present
- Completed: 5
- Active: 1 (Taiwan)

General characteristics
- Type: Dock landing ship
- Displacement: 14,000 long tons (14,225 t) Full
- Length: 553 ft (169 m)
- Beam: 85 ft (26 m)
- Draft: 20 ft (6.1 m)
- Propulsion: 2 × geared steam turbines; 2 × boilers, 600 psi; 2 shafts, 24,000 shp (18,000 kW) total
- Speed: 22 knots (25 mph; 41 km/h)
- Range: 14,800 nmi (27,400 km; 17,000 mi) at 12 kn (22 km/h)
- Boats & landing craft carried: 3 × LCACs Or 3 × LCUs Or 9 × LCMs
- Troops: 330
- Complement: 18 officers, 340 enlisted
- Armament: 4 × twin 3"/50 caliber gun (removed in 1980); 2 × 20 mm Phalanx CIWS; 2 × Mk-38 chain guns; 4 × .50 cal machine guns

The Anchorage-class dock landing ships were a series of five dock landing ships (LSD) constructed and commissioned by the United States Navy between 1965 and 1972. US Navy decommissioned all five of them by 2003. They are succeeded by Whidbey Island-class LSDs and Harpers Ferry-class LSDs.

== Design and development ==
The Anchorage class of dock landing ships was built as a replacement for the remaining aging war-built LSDs of the Ashland and Casa Grande classes. Their principal intended role was to carry additional landing craft to supplement those carried by the Amphibious transport docks (LPD)s, which carried less landing craft in order to accommodate more troops and cargo.

The Anchorage class was slightly larger than the preceding Thomaston class, but were of generally similar design, with a large Well dock aft to accommodate landing craft, and a removable flight deck fitted above the well deck to allow the operation of helicopters, although no hangar was provided. The well dock was 430 feet (130 m) long and 40 feet (12 m) wide, and could accommodate three Landing Craft Utilitys or nine LCM-8 Landing Craft Mechanised. The ship could carry 375 troops compared with the 345 carried by the Thomastons, while 12,000 square feet (1,115 m^{2}) of vehicle parking space was provided.

The ships were propelled by two geared steam turbines driving two shafts and giving a total of 24,000 shaft horsepower (18,000 kW). This gave a speed of 20 knots (23 mph; 37 km/h), the standard speed of the postwar US Navy amphibious fleet. As built, the ships had a defensive armament of eight 3"/50 Mark 33 anti-aircraft guns in four twin mounts, while major sensors included SPS-10 surface search radar and SPS-40 air-search radar.

== Construction and service ==
The name ship of the class, USS Anchorage (LSD-36) was ordered under the Fiscal year 1965 (FY65) shipbuilding program, with three more (USS Portland (LSD-37), USS Pensacola (LSD-38) and USS Mount Vernon (LSD-39)) ordered under the FY66 program and the final ship of the class, USS Fort Fisher (LSD-40), under the FY67 programme. They were laid down between 1967 and 1970 and entered service between 1969 and 1972.

The fire-control directors for the 3 in guns were removed in the late 1970s, while the ships' gun armament was gradually reduced, with two mounts removed by 1990, and the remaining 3 inch guns removed by 1994. Two 20mm Phalanx CIWS mounts to defend against anti-ship missiles and two 25 mm Bushmaster cannon to defend against surface targets were fitted to replace these weapons.

== Ship list ==
Name	Builder	Laid Down	Launched	Commissioned	Fate
USS Anchorage (LSD-36)	Ingalls Shipbuilding, Pascagoula, Mississippi	13 March 1967	5 May 1968	15 March 1969	Decommissioned 1 October 2003; Sunk as target 17 July 2010
USS Portland (LSD-37)	General Dynamics, Quincy, Massachusetts	21 September 1967	20 December 1969	3 October 1970	Decommissioned 4 August 2003; Sunk as target 25 April 2004
USS Pensacola (LSD-38)	General Dynamics, Quincy, Massachusetts	12 March 1969	11 July 1970	27 March 1971	Sold to Taiwan Navy in 2000; ROCS Hsu Hai (LSD-193)
USS Mount Vernon (LSD-39)	General Dynamics, Quincy, Massachusetts	29 January 1970	17 April 1971	13 May 1972	Decommissioned 25 July 2003; Sunk as target 16 June 2005
USS Fort Fisher (LSD-40)	General Dynamics, Quincy, Massachusetts	15 July 1970	22 April 1972	12 September 1972	Decommissioned 27 February 1998; Sold for scrapping 22 May 2009

== See also ==
Equivalent landing ships of the same era

- Ouragan class
- Fearless class
