= USS Mount Vernon (LSD-39) =

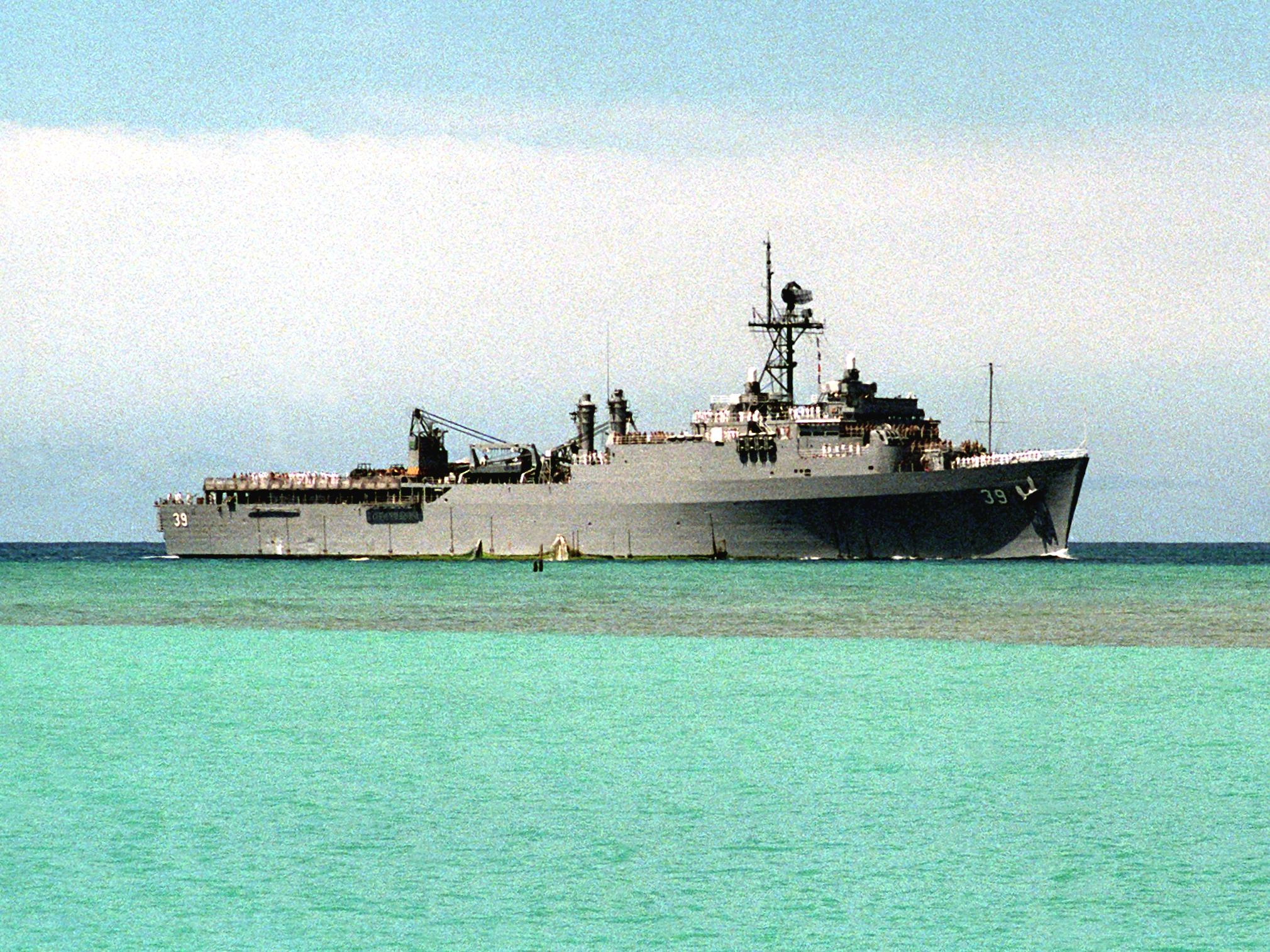
- USS Mount Vernon in 1991

History

United States
- Name: USS Mount Vernon
- Namesake: George Washington's home, Mount Vernon
- Awarded: 25 February 1966
- Builder: General Dynamics
- Laid down: 29 January 1970
- Launched: 17 April 1971
- Acquired: 1 April 1972
- Commissioned: 13 May 1972
- Decommissioned: 25 July 2003
- Stricken: 8 March 2004
- Motto: "Exitus acta probat," or "Action Produces Results."
- Fate: Sunk as target, 16 June 2005

General characteristics
- Class & type: Anchorage-class dock landing ship
- Tonnage: 5,440 long tons (5,530 t) deadweight
- Displacement: 8,762 long tons (8,903 t) light; 14,202 long tons (14,430 t) full
- Length: 553 ft (169 m) overall; 540 ft (160 m) at the waterline
- Beam: 84 ft (26 m)
- Draft: 20 ft (6.1 m) (max navigational draft)
- Propulsion: Steam turbines, two propellers.
- Complement: 52 officers, 742 enlisted.
- Notes: Steel hull, steel superstructure.

USS Mount Vernon (LSD-39) was an Anchorage-class dock landing ship of the United States Navy. She was the fifth ship of the U.S. Navy to bear the name. She was built in Massachusetts in 1972 and homeported in Southern California for 31 years until being decommissioned on 25 July 2003. Mount Vernon acted as the control ship for the cleanup of the Exxon Valdez oil spill. In 2005, she was intentionally destroyed off the coast of Hawaii as part of a training exercise. USS Mount Vernon also appeared in the Season 7 episode 19 of The Love Boat when they visited Hong Kong.

== History ==
Mount Vernon was awarded to General Dynamics Quincy Shipbuilding Division in Quincy, Massachusetts, on 25 February 1966. After commissioning in Boston Naval Shipyard in 1972, she was homeported in San Diego, California.

In April 1975, Mount Vernon participated in Operation Frequent Wind, the evacuation of Saigon, Vietnam.

Mount Vernon sailed on 12 November 1981 from San Diego for a Westpac/Indian Ocean deployment as part of Amphibious Ready Group Alpha/Amphibious Squadron One (USS Tripoli (LPH-11), with MAU 31st/HMM-265 'Flying Tigers' (REIN) embarked, USS Duluth (LPD-6), USS Fresno (LST-1182)) during which USS Mount Vernon and Amphibious Squadron One visited Perth/Fremantle, Western Australia for R&R from 28 January to 3 February 1982. USS Mount Vernon returned home to San Diego, CA, on 15 May 1982

Beginning 1984 through 22 July 1992, Mount Vernon was homeported in Long Beach, California, before returning to San Diego.

In her 31 years of service, Mount Vernon completed 15 deployments in the U.S. Seventh Fleet in the Far East.

Because of the remote location of the cleanup sites of the Exxon Valdez oil spill, there was a desperate need for floating facilities to house shoreline cleanup workers. In response, the Navy provided amphibious transport docks and dock landing ships (LSDs). Juneau arrived in Alaska on 24 April 1989 followed by Fort McHenry on 4 May 1989.

Over the summer months the Navy replaced Juneau first with Cleveland and Ogden, and then with Duluth. Meanwhile, Mount Vernon relieved Fort McHenry and then left the cleanup operations on 18 July without a replacement, reducing the naval presence to one ship. Duluth sailed without replacement on 16 September, ending the naval ship presence in the oil spill cleanup operations.

The ships functioned as floating hotels, providing medical, laundry, housing, dining, and sleeping facilities for shoreline cleanup workers. They also provided communications support and functioned as command and control platforms and helipads for the forward deployment of helicopters. They supported base operations of the landing craft, providing maintenance, fuel, and docking. Deployed with the ships were United States Marine Corps CH-46 helicopters and Army medical evacuation helicopters, which performed a variety of essential missions. Naval ship operations centered in Prince William Sound and were especially important in open sea areas because commercial berthing vessels could not operate in the rough water.

On 10 June 1998, Commander Maureen A. Farren became the first American woman to command a U.S. Navy surface warship when she assumed command of USS Mount Vernon.

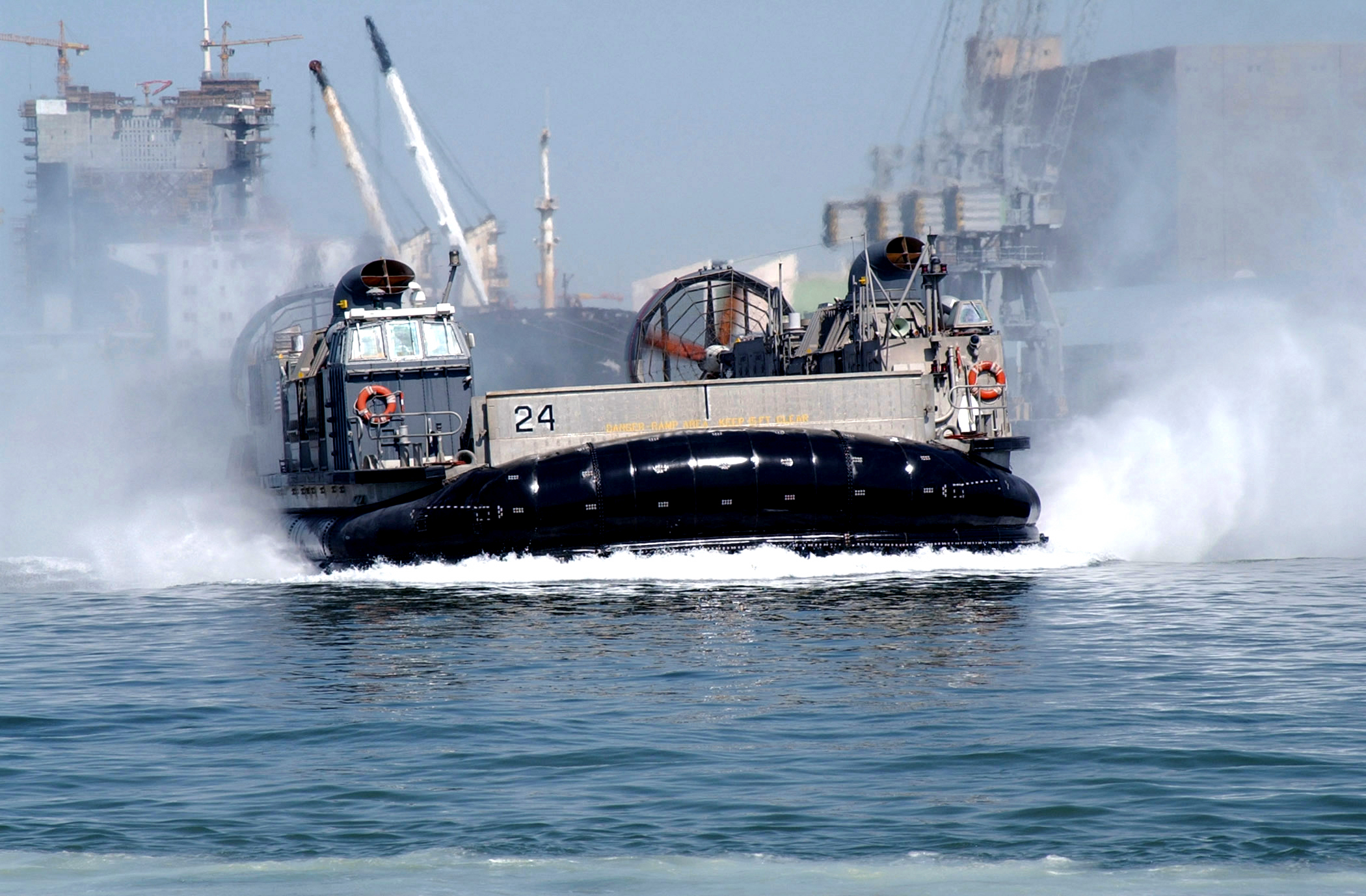
A Landing Craft Air Cushion (LCAC) carries U.S. Marines assigned to the 11th Marine Expeditionary Unit embarked aboard USS Mount Vernon.

During her career, Mount Vernon accumulated many awards, including:

- Joint Meritorious Unit Award,
- Navy Meritorious Unit Commendation,
- Navy Battle "E" Ribbon, (2),
- National Defense Service Medal,
- Armed Forces Expeditionary Medal, (4),
- Southwest Asia Service Medal,
- Humanitarian Service Medal, (2),
- Coast Guard Special Operations Service Medal, and the
- Kuwait Liberation Medal.

Mount Vernon was decommissioned on 25 July 2003. Afterwards, she stayed at the Naval Inactive Ship Maintenance Facility, in Pearl Harbor, Hawaii. On 16 June 2005, she was sunk in a fleet training exercise for P-3 Orion squadrons VP-1, VP-9, VP-46, and VP-47. The sinking was part of operation "Patrolling Thunder" and took place off the northwest coast of Kauaʻi, Hawaii. Expended in the sinking were 3 Harpoon missiles, 4 Maverick missiles, and 18 bombs of 500 pounds apiece.

== Dock landing ships ==
Dock landing ships support amphibious operations including landings via Landing Craft Air Cushion (LCAC), conventional landing craft and helicopters, onto hostile shores. The Anchorage-class combined a well-deck with a flight deck to support both small-craft and airborne operations. These ships also featured the facilities necessary to provide services to small boats, including dry docking and repairs.

Mount Vernon was the first West coast ship to be modified to support LCAC operations.

== Notes ==
External images
- Mount Vernon commissioning ceremony in 1972.
- View of the bow in drydock, 1976.
- Mount Vernon entering San Diego bay.
