= USS Anchorage (LSD-36) =

Anchorage Class Ship

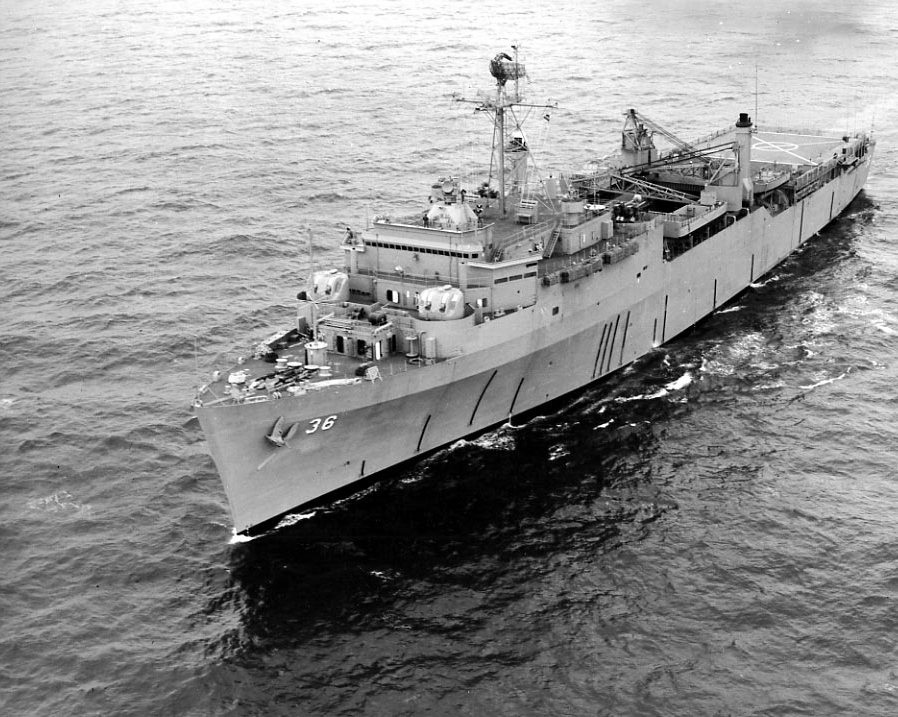
- USS Anchorage (LSD-36), a US Navy dock landing ship, underway off Pascagoula, Mississippi (USA), while running trials on 27 January 1969.

History

United States
- Name: Anchorage
- Namesake: City of Anchorage, Alaska
- Awarded: 29 June 1965
- Builder: Ingalls Shipbuilding, Pascagoula, Mississippi
- Laid down: 13 March 1967
- Launched: 5 May 1968
- Commissioned: 15 March 1969
- Decommissioned: 1 October 2003
- Stricken: 8 March 2004
- Identification: Hull symbol: LSD-36; Code letters: NGRQ
- Motto: 1st of its class
- Honors and awards: 6 × battle stars (Vietnam service)
- Fate: Sunk as a target, 17 July 2010
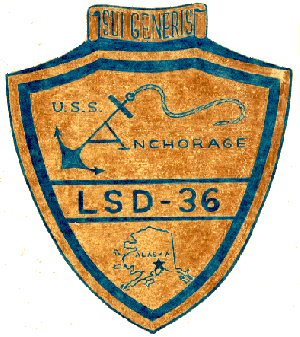
- Badge

General characteristics
- Class & type: Anchorage-class dock landing ship
- Tonnage: 5,570 long tons deadweight (DWT)
- Displacement: 14,095 long tons (14,321 t) (full); 8,325 long tons (8,459 t) (light)
- Length: 553 ft (169 m)
- Beam: 84 ft (26 m)
- Draft: 19 ft (5.8 m)
- Installed power: 2 × steam boilers, 600 psi (4,100 kPa); 24,000 shp (18,000 kW)
- Propulsion: 2 × De Laval steam turbines; 2 × propellers
- Speed: 20 kn (37 km/h; 23 mph)
- Boats & landing craft carried: 3 × LCACs; or 2 × LCUs
- Troops: 320
- Complement: 24 officers, 300 enlisted
- Armament: 4 × twin 3 in (76 mm)/50 caliber guns (removed 1980); 2 × 20 mm (0.8 in) Phalanx CIWS mounts; 2 × 25 mm (1.0 in) Mk-38 Bushmaster chain guns

Service record
- Operations: Vietnam War (1970-72); Gulf War; Operation Continue Hope, Somalia (1994); Operation Enduring Freedom; Operation Iraqi Freedom
- Awards: Combat Action Ribbon (retroactive); Joint Meritorious Unit Award; Navy Unit Commendation (2); Navy Meritorious Unit Commendation; Navy Battle "E" Ribbon (7); Navy Expeditionary Medal (Iran/Indian Ocean); National Defense Service Medal (2); Armed Forces Expeditionary Medal (5); Vietnam Service Medal (6); Southwest Asia Service Medal; Global War on Terrorism Expeditionary Medal; Humanitarian Service Medal; Philippine Presidential Unit Citation; Republic of Vietnam Campaign Medal; Kuwait Liberation Medal (Saudi Arabia); Kuwait Liberation Medal (Kuwait)

USS Anchorage (LSD-36) was the lead ship of the Anchorage-class dock landing ship of the United States Navy. In the ship's 34 years of service, she completed 19 deployments in the western Pacific and became the most decorated dock landing ship on the west coast.

== Construction ==
Anchorage was awarded to Ingalls Shipbuilding in Pascagoula, Mississippi on 29 June 1965 and her keel was laid down on 13 March 1967. She was launched on 5 May 1968; sponsored by Mrs. Alexander S. Heyward Jr., the wife of Vice Admiral Alexander S. Heyward; and commissioned at the Norfolk Naval Shipyard, Portsmouth, Virginia, on 15 March 1969.

Outfitted with a large floodable stern section accessed through an enormous operable stern gate, Anchorage served as a launch platform for large landing craft, such as the LCU, as well as a "boat haven" to shelter other small craft utilized in an amphibious landing. The ship was able to provide a minimal degree of naval gunfire support through the use of two sets of twin 3 in (76 mm)/50 caliber guns mounted on the 02-level fore and aft. In later years these guns were removed to be replaced with Mk-38 machine guns and two Phalanx CIWS for missile defense. In its final decade of service with the US Navy, it functioned primarily as a platform for two LCAC hovercraft landing vehicles and embarked Marines.

== Service history ==
After a brief, round-trip cruise to Andros Island, Bahamas, the Anchorage left Norfolk on 24 June, bound for the west coast. She paused at Mayport and Fort Lauderdale, Florida; transited the Panama Canal on 16 July; and arrived at her home port San Diego, California, on 26 July. At the end of shakedown training off the California coast, she entered the Mare Island Naval Shipyard, Vallejo, California, on 1 November, for post-shakedown availability.

=== Pacific – Far East service ===
==== 1970 ====
Anchorage participated in numerous military operations. At the end of the Vietnam War, the ship carried Marines back to the United States as a part of the US withdrawal from Vietnam.

Anchorage returned to San Diego on 9 January 1970. She set sail on the 31st for the western Pacific (WestPac) to transport Marine Corps personnel back to the United States as part of Operation Keystone Bluejay, a planned withdrawal of American troops from Vietnam. On 19 February, the ship arrived at Danang, Republic of Vietnam; took on board the personnel and equipment of the 7th Motor Battalion; and sailed for the United States. She reached Delmar, California, on 12 March and debarked her passengers.

Following a month and one-half in port at San Diego for training and upkeep, Anchorage got underway on 1 May with other units of Amphibious Squadron (PhibRon) 5 for the Far East. She stopped at Pearl Harbor and then sailed to Johnston Atoll to deliver several landing craft. The ship next proceeded to Yokosuka, Japan, and arrived there on 19 May for voyage repairs. Her next port call was at Buckner Bay, Okinawa, where Marines came on board for transportation to Subic Bay, Philippines. Upon the completion of that embarkation, PhibRon 5 units assumed duty as Amphibious Ready Group (ARG) Alfa.

From 6 to 18 June, Anchorage carried small craft between ports along the coast of Vietnam. Her ports of call included Vung Tau, Camranh Bay, Qui Nhon, Danang, and An Thoi, near Phú Quốc. She anchored near An Thoi from 11 to 14 June to provide dry dock services for the ships at the naval activity there.

On 22 June, the ship participated in the first of several amphibious exercises conducted by ARG Alfa at Green Beach, near Subic Bay. During these operations, she acted as a primary control ship for the direction and control of landing craft while they moved to the beach.

The ship pulled into Sasebo, Japan, early in July for a period of rest and relaxation for the crew. She got underway again on 16 July for amphibious exercises off Green Beach. On the 31st, she arrived at Okinawa to take Battalion Landing Team 2/9 on board for transportation to Subic Bay. Anchorage arrived at Subic Bay on 18 August for upkeep. Her next port of call was Hong Kong, which she visited from 10 until 18 September and then returned to the Subic Bay operating area.

From 24 September through 8 October, Anchorage traveled among Subic Bay and Vung Tau, Camranh Bay and Danang, Vietnam, carrying various small craft. Late in October, she carried out relief operations in Lagonoy Gulf on the eastern coast of the Philippines for victims of Typhoons Joan and Kate. After touching at Keelung, Taiwan, on 29 October, the ship proceeded to Okinawa to pick up a landing craft for transportation to Subic Bay. She took part in amphibious exercises at Green Beach on 7 November, then put into port at Subic Bay. From the 20th to the 23d, Anchorage was at Okinawa to disembark Marines and to unload their equipment. During this time, PhibRon 5 was relieved of duties as ARG Alfa. The ship then paid a short visit to Yokosuka, Japan, for liberty and the loading of equipment for transportation to the United States. Sailing from Japan on 30 November, the vessel arrived in San Diego on 10 December.

==== 1971 ====
Anchorage remained in availability until 20 February 1971, when she got underway for Port Hueneme, California. There, she loaded construction materials for a communications center on the island in the Indian Ocean, Diego Garcia, to be built as a part of Operation Reindeer Station. She left the California coast on 22 February bound for Australia. The vessel made port calls at Sydney and Perth, Australia, late in March and then pushed on into the Indian Ocean. Upon arriving at Diego Garcia on 4 April, she unloaded the construction materials and sailed the next day for Subic Bay to obtain minor repairs and replenishment. Following a visit to Hong Kong from 17 to 22 April, the ship sailed to Danang where she embarked Marine Corps personnel and equipment for return to the United States as part of Operation Keystone Robin. On 23 April, she shaped a course for San Diego.

Anchorage arrived in her home port on 11 May and, on 28 June, resumed operations as a training ship for landing exercises off Seal Beach, California. This study was followed by refresher training and a period inport at San Diego. From 2 to 6 August, the vessel was again involved in exercises off Seal Beach. She left San Diego on 16 August to sail to her namesake city, Anchorage, Alaska, where she remained from 22 to 26 August. After pausing at Alameda, California, to unload aircraft, she arrived back at San Diego on 1 September and entered upkeep.

The ship sailed for Hawaii on 1 October and, en route, participated in Convoy Exercise 3-71. She spent two days at Pearl Harbor before continuing on to Buckner Bay, Okinawa. There, she rejoined ARG Alfa and embarked Marines for transportation to Subic Bay. Early in November, the ship visited Kaohsiung, Taiwan. From 13 to 20 November, she shuttled landing craft between Vung Tau and Subic Bay. During the last few weeks of 1971, the ship visited Sasebo, Japan, and Hong Kong for liberty calls and also carried Marines and equipment from Okinawa to Subic Bay.

==== 1972 ====
After a period of repair work, Anchorage sailed for Buckner Bay on 17 January 1972 to embark Marines for transportation back to Subic Bay. Late in January, she carried out wet-well operations at Danang, Qui Nhon, and Vung Tau and, in mid-February, traveled to Singapore for a visit before returning to Subic Bay. After a brief trip to Kure, Japan, in early March, the ship was involved in amphibious exercises. On 31 March, she got underway to rendezvous with Task Group 76.5 which she met on 2 April for operations off the coast of Vietnam through 6 May.

The ship was at Subic Bay from 9 to 18 May and then sailed back to Vietnamese waters for wet-well lifts to Vung Tau, Hoi An, and Danang. On 24 May, she took part in Exercise "Song Thanh 6-72". She reached Okinawa on 14 June to embark troops bound for the Philippines and arrived at Subic Bay on the 20th. After a series of amphibious landing exercises, Anchorage resumed wet-well operations between Vung Tau and Subic Bay.

The vessel visited Kaohsiung in early July, then arrived back at Subic Bay on the 8th. She left the Philippines, bound for home, on 9 July and made San Diego on 24 July. She remained in port through 4 December, when the vessel got underway for independent type exercises off the southern California coast. She returned to San Diego on the 7th and entered a holiday leave and upkeep status.

==== 1973 ====
After local operations, Anchorage traveled to Seal Beach late in January 1973 to unload her ammunition. She returned to San Diego on 1 February and began overhaul there on the 19th. During this yard work, a fire broke out in a maintenance shop and prolonged her stay in overhaul. The ship finally got underway on 23 September for sea trials and started refresher amphibious training late in October. On 8 December, the vessel commenced another WestPac deployment.

==== 1974 ====
During the cruise, the ship visited Subic Bay; Buckner Bay; Sasebo and Iwakuni, Japan; Diego Garcia; and Singapore. While off Korea, Anchorage joined ARG Bravo for Operation Fly Away. Leaving Subic Bay on 28 March 1974, she made stops at Guam and Pearl Harbor before arriving back in San Diego on 18 April and entering a standdown period which lasted through 29 July. On that day, the ship sailed northward to carry out a survey mission of potential amphibious training areas in Alaska. During her cruise, embarked scientists surveyed 10 possible landing sites and the vessel visited in Seattle, Washington; Nanaimo, British Columbia; and Sitka and Anchorage, Alaska, before reaching San Diego again on 5 September. Anchorage began a restricted availability at Long Beach, California, on 17 October and, after the work was completed on 16 December, she returned to home port for the holidays.

==== 1975 ====
On 6 January 1975, the ship began two weeks of amphibious refresher training off the southern California coast. She then participated in Operation Bedstream with other ships of PhibRon 5. After a period of upkeep in San Diego, Anchorage again sailed for the Orient on 28 March.

In April 1975, Anchorage participated in Operation Frequent Wind, the evacuation of Saigon, Vietnam. The ship reached Vietnamese waters on 30 April and provided material support to ships evacuating Vietnamese refugees. On 2 May, she left the Vung Tau holding area with the other ships involved in Operation Frequent Wind.

On 13 May, her scheduled operations were interrupted by the Mayaguez incident. Anchorage was ordered to proceed south to provide support as needed for the rescue of Mayaguez. Following the ship's rescue, Anchorage resumed her original schedule which included upkeep in Sasebo, Japan; a visit to Keelung, Taiwan; and a port call to Inchon, Republic of Korea. Early September brought her a liberty call at Hong Kong. She then proceeded to Yokosuka for upkeep. Following stops at Keelung and Buckner Bay, Anchorage sailed from Okinawa on 28 October to return to her home port. En route, she participated in Operation Polymode before arriving at San Diego on 16 November for upkeep and local operations through the end of the year.

==== 1976 ====
During the first three and one-half months of 1976 Anchorage continued local operations off the southern California coast. From 26 April through 17 June, she was in restricted availability in preparation for a visit to Alaska. However, that trip was cancelled, and the ship prepared to deploy for the rest of the year.

==== 1977 ====
Tests and inspections occupied Anchorage during the first two and one-half months of 1977 before another WestPac deployment began on 28 March. She stopped briefly at Pearl Harbor, then pushed on to Eniwetok to unload cargo and vehicles. During her cruise, the ship served as a member of ARG Alfa. She also visited Guam; Subic Bay and Iloilo, Philippines; Singapore; Hong Kong; Keelung; and Yokosuka. Among the amphibious exercises in which she participated was Operation Fortress Lightning, held in the Philippines, in waters near Santa Cruz, Mindanao Island, from 10 to 23 October. Upon the conclusion of this exercise, the vessel made her way back to the west coast of the United States via Okinawa, Guam, and Hawaii. On 17 November, she pulled into San Diego and spent the rest of the year in upkeep.

==== 1978 ====
The ship was involved in training operations along the California coast in January 1978. On 20 February, she got underway for Bremerton, Washington, to carry Army troops to their home base. The ship arrived at San Diego on 3 March and began preparations for overhaul. She got underway, in tow of Abnaki, for the Long Beach Naval Shipyard on 14 April, and commenced a regular overhaul there the next day. Upon completion of this work, the ship resumed operations on 13 December when she began sea trials.

==== 1979 ====
Anchorage returned to San Diego on 15 January 1979. During the next eight months, she was involved in post-overhaul maintenance and training. She operated along the southern California coast and held refresher training and amphibious refresher training. On 24 September, the ship got underway to take part in Exercise Kernal Potlatch II, a joint American-Canadian fleet exercise. Having concluded a successful amphibious landing on the northern coast of Vancouver Island, she made a port call at Esquimalt, British Columbia. After debarking Marines at Camp Pendleton, Anchorage returned to San Diego on 13 October. She participated in local operations and training exercises through the end of the year in preparation for an upcoming deployment in 1980.

==== 1980 ====
Four days into the new year, Anchorage slipped her moorings and left San Diego bound for the exotic Orient. Along the way, she visited Pearl Harbor, Eniwetok Atoll in the Marshall Islands, and Guam in the Mariana Islands before arriving at Subic Bay in the Philippines on 6 February 1980. Upon arrival, she loaded a refurbished utility landing craft (LCU) for transportation to the Republic of Djibouti, former French Somaliland, located on the northeast coast of Africa near the Horn of Africa. The LCU-dubbed Le Bac de la Paix (tr. the boat of peace)-was a gift from the United States to Djibouti to enhance the country's inadequate commercial transportation system. Anchorage stood out of Subic Bay on 15 February to begin her goodwill mission. Steaming by way of Singapore, she crossed the Indian Ocean and arrived in Djibouti on 3 March. The Anchorage spent two days in Djibouti, delivering America's gift and helping to cement relations between the two governments and peoples. From Djibouti, she headed for Diego Garcia Island to deliver barges to that isolated American outpost in the middle of the Indian Ocean. The ship stopped at Diego Garcia from 12 to 15 March and then resumed her voyage back to the Philippines. She made a stop at Penang, Malaysia, along the way and reentered Subic Bay on 24 March.

During the three months that remained of her 1980 deployment, Anchorage carried out operations in surroundings more familiar to 7th Fleet ships than the Horn of Africa and the Indian Ocean. Early in April, she visited Hong Kong before voyaging to Okinawa to embark Marine Corps units on the 17th and 18th. From Okinawa, the dock landing ship sailed via Subic Bay and Singapore to Thailand where she joined elements of the Royal Thai Navy and the Royal Thai Marine Corps in amphibious training exercises. She concluded the interlude in Thai waters with a visit to Pattaya between 5 and 10 May. Anchorage returned to Subic Bay on 19 May and remained in port until near the end of the first week in June. On 6 June, she got underway to return the embarked Marines to their base on Okinawa. She stopped at Naha, Okinawa, from 10 to 12 June and then returned to sea for the voyage back to the United States. The trip home included a two-day stop at Pearl Harbor and ended back at San Diego on 3 July.

After the usual month of relative inactivity following an overseas deployment, Anchorage began west coast operations early in August with a courtesy visit to Seattle, Washington, for the city's annual sea fair. Normal duties continued until late September when she returned to San Diego for a two-month availability. Anchorage completed repairs on 20 November and resumed operations out of her home port.

==== 1981 ====
Various training evolutions occupied her time through May and into June 1981. On 23 June, Anchorage stood out of San Diego on her way to duty with the 7th Fleet in the Far East. She stopped at Pearl Harbor at the beginning of July and remained in the Hawaiian Islands for the first three weeks of the month completing an oft-delayed propulsion plant certification. On the 22d, she resumed her voyage west. Anchorage entered her first western Pacific port at Buckner Bay, Okinawa, on 3 August and embarked Marine Corps units for transportation to Yokosuka, Japan. Throughout, her assignment with the 7th Fleet, Anchorage spent much of her time carrying Marines between their bases and training exercises. In some cases, Anchorage herself participated in the exercises; in others, she simply provided transportation to the location of the exercise. Consequently, she called at a number of ports in the Orient-most frequently at ports in Okinawa, Japan, and Korea but also at Thai ports occasionally. Anchorage completed her last 7th Fleet mission at Naha, Okinawa, late in November and, on the 21st got underway for the voyage back to California. En route, she made an 11-day visit to Guam and a brief, one-day pause at Pearl Harbor. She pulled into San Diego two days before Christmas.

==== 1982 ====
Post-deployment leave and upkeep carried her well into January 1982. After a brief period underway in the southern California operating area Anchorage began preparations at the end of January for regular overhaul at San Diego. The actual repair and modification work began on 1 March. Over the ensuing seven months, the ship received general repairs and upgrading throughout as well as work on her propulsion plant, modernization of her communications spaces, and an enhancement of her defense capability against antiship missiles. Anchorage conducted sea trials in the local operating area during the first half of November and then spent the remainder of the year in port.

==== 1983 ====
Anchorage resumed operations out of San Diego early in 1983. In May, she paid a courtesy visit to her namesake city, Anchorage, Alaska. Upon her return to San Diego in the middle of June, Anchorage began a three-month availability in preparation for a deployment to the western Pacific scheduled to start in the middle of September. Except for a period underway between 22 and 31 August, Anchorage was in San Diego continuously from 11 June to 12 September. On the latter day, she slipped her moorings and stood out to sea on her way back to the Far East. The usual stop at Pearl Harbor lasted from 20 September to 2 October, and then Anchorage resumed the voyage west. The dock landing ship arrived in Yokosuka, Japan, on 14 October. She spent the rest of October at Yokosuka, then got underway for Okinawa on 1 November to begin conveying Marine Corps units between their bases and the sites of training exercises. As in the past, the dock landing ship participated in some, but not all, of the exercises to which she provided transportation for the Marines.

==== 1984 ====
The deployment lasted through the end of 1983 and into the early months of 1984. She disembarked her last Marine Corps passengers at Yokosuka at the end of January 1984 and remained there until the beginning of the second week in February. On the 8th, Anchorage set out upon the first leg of the voyage back to the United States. On her way, she made stops at Guam and at Pearl Harbor before ending the deployment at San Diego on 6 March 1984. Except for a brief period underway inside the port on 17 April, Anchorage remained moored at San Diego for almost five months performing repairs and modifications. Near the end of July, she began sea trials out of San Diego that lasted into the fourth week in August. On 23 August the dock landing ship made the brief passage from San Diego to her new home port, Long Beach. Anchorage took about two weeks to get settled into her new base of operations and then embarked upon a series of training evolutions in the local operating area.

==== 1985–1986 ====
Those drills and exercises - punctuated by periods in port for upkeep and repairs - occupied her time during the remaining months of 1984 and for most of the first quarter of 1985. On 27 March 1985, she left Long Beach bound for the Orient. The dock landing ship interrupted her long voyage briefly at Sasebo, Japan, on 16 April to pick up mail and then arrived at Pohang, Korea, on the 17th. At Pohang, Anchorage embarked a Marine Corps contingent and set sail for Okinawa on 18 April. For the next four months, she criss-crossed the distant reaches of the Pacific delivering Marines to various points for combat training and returning them to their bases. On occasion, she joined in the exercises herself to practice her role as an amphibious warship. Her final group of passengers came on board at Yokohama, Japan, between 9 and 11 August and disembarked at Buckner Bay, Okinawa, on the 14th.

On the 15th Anchorage began the passage home. She stopped at Pearl Harbor from the 26th to the 28th and arrived in Del Mar, Calif., on 3 September 1985. The following day, Anchorage moved to Long Beach where she began a five-week post-deployment stand-down. With her return to active operations on 10 October, Anchorage embarked upon an extended period of local operations that occupied her not only during the remainder of 1985 but for the whole of 1986 as well.

==== 1987 ====
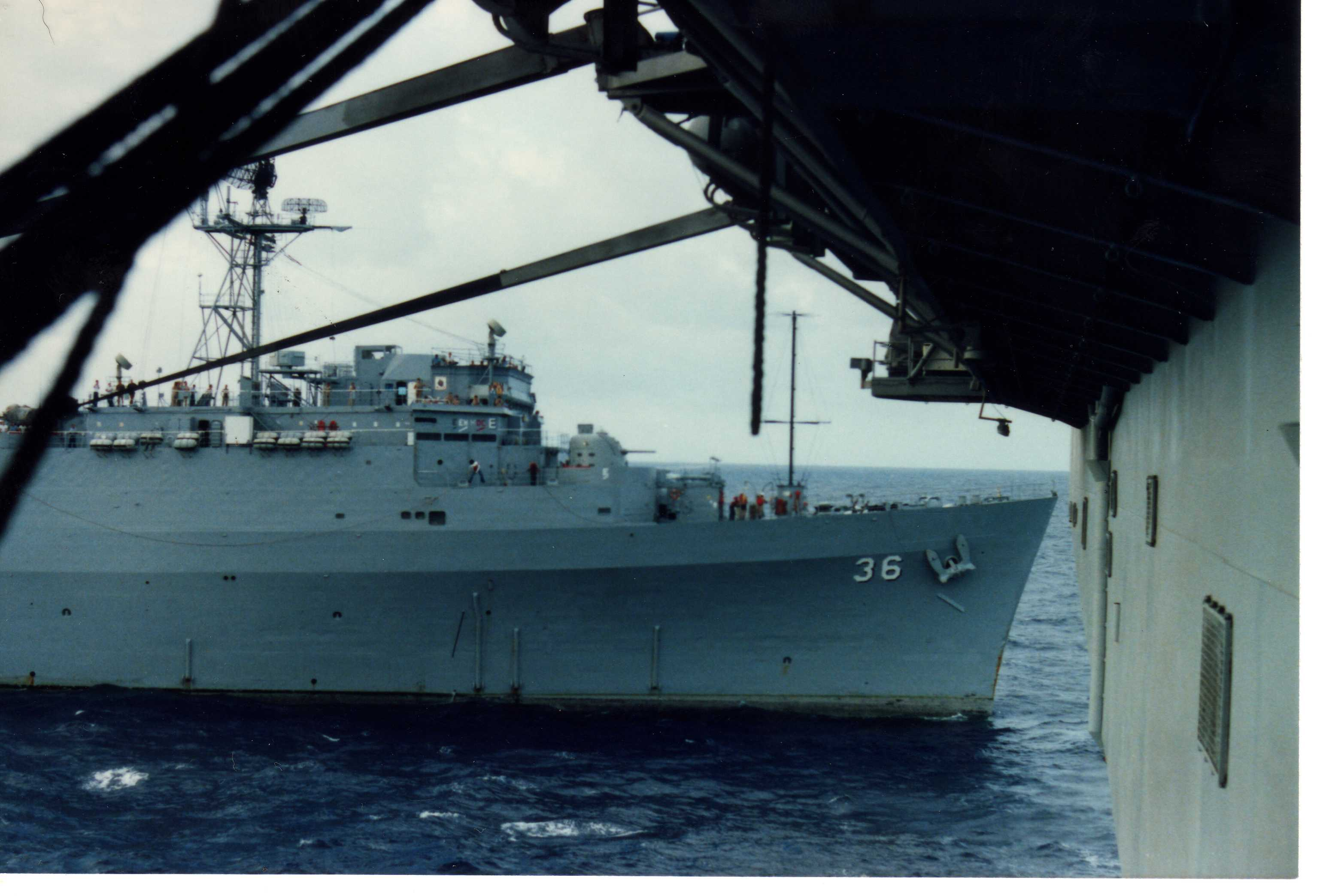
Failed to shoot the tow line, cast it with fishing poles.

As of the beginning of 1987, Anchorage was moored at Long Beach. In January 1987, Anchorage got underway for her Westpac deployment. Whilst in the Bering Sea, the ship and crew battled 90-foot (27 m) seas sailing through an area where two cyclones had merged. Unfortunately, the USS Belleau Wood (LHA 3) received extensive damage from the storm which led to an extended stay in the naval shipyards at Subic Bay. Other ports of call during the deployment included Okinawa, Japan; Pohang and Pusan, Korea; Pattaya Beach, Thailand; Hobart, Tasmania and Pearl Harbor, HI.

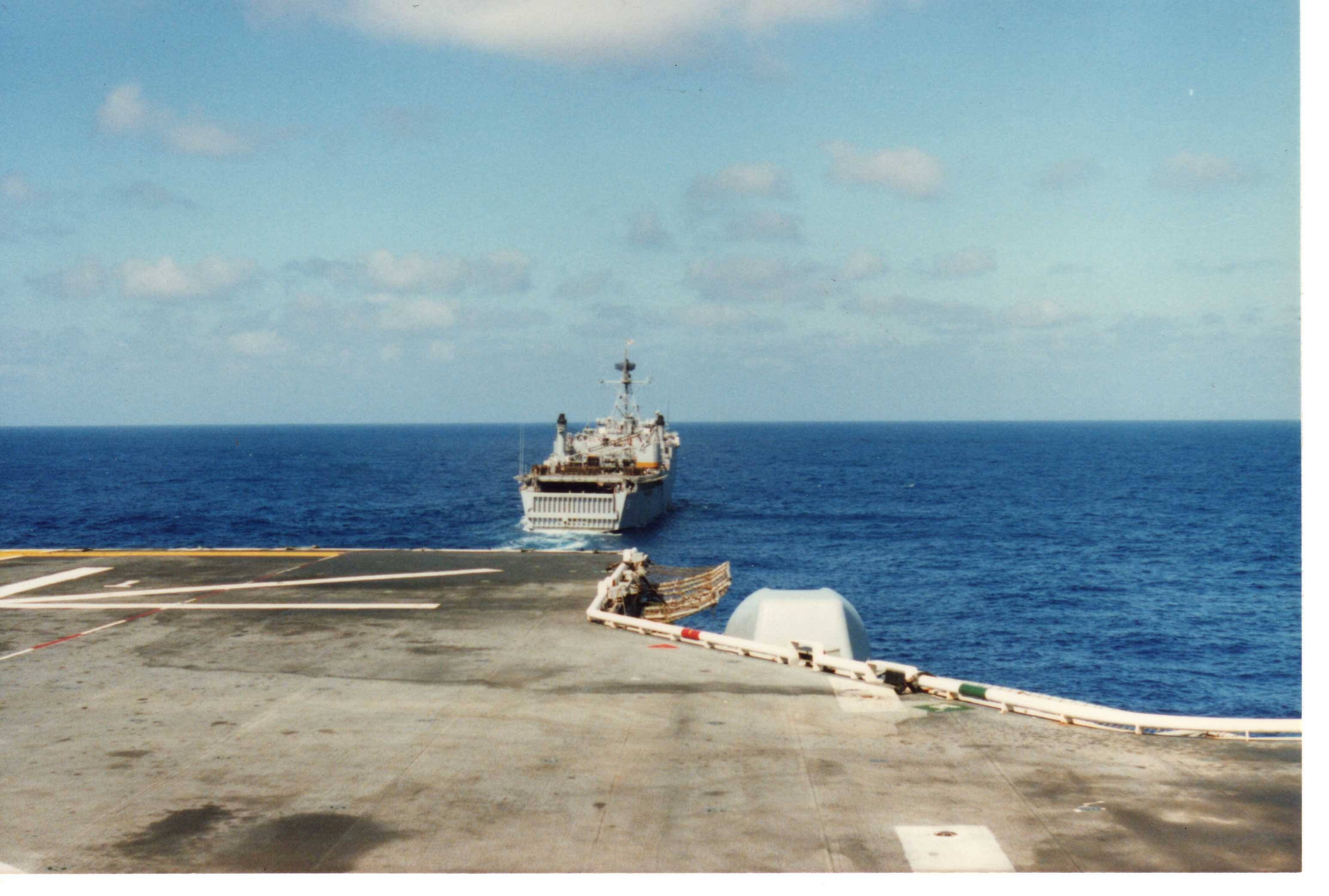
Anchorage towing Belleau Wood (the Drift Wood), 1987

Anchorage had the privilege to turn sailors and Marines into Golden Shellbacks on 4 March 1987 when she crossed the Equator and the International Dateline simultaneously. During the 1987 crossing, Anchorage was hosting Golf Battery 3/12. After the Crossing the Line Ceremony at the Equator, Belleau Wood lost power as both engines and one of two generators stopped, causing her to drift for 5 days at sea and have to be towed by the Anchorage. Destined for Tasmania, the Belleau Wood limped into Sydney Harbor for repairs to the boilers while the Anchorage replaced her in Tasmania. This left the Belleau Wood with the unfortunate nickname 'The USS Driftwood'.

=== Operation Desert Storm ===
==== 1991 ====
In 1991, she served in Operation Desert Storm.

==== 1994 ====
In 1994, she served in Operation Continue Hope in Mogadishu, Somalia. Also while there assisted in Operation Quick Draw and Operation Distant Runner with the Hotel Rwanda incident and Burundi.

==== 1996 ====
In 1996, following completion of a deployment during which she supported Operation Southern Watch in the Persian Gulf, Anchorage entered dry dock for her final dry dock planned maintenance availability during which she received numerous systems upgrades and modifications.

=== USS Cole bombing ===
==== 2000 ====
Later in 2000 she was used to assist Cole following her bombing in Yemen.

=== Middle East operations – decommissioning ===
==== 2003 ====
In July 2003, Anchorage returned to her home port of San Diego, California after supporting Operation Enduring Freedom and Operation Iraqi Freedom. She was decommissioned on 1 October 2003.

Anchorage was approved for transfer to Taiwan by the United States Senate in November 2003. She was scheduled to replace the former Comstock, now Chung Cheng, however the transfer never took place and Anchorage remained at the Inactive Ships Maintenance Facility at Pearl Harbor.

==== 2010 ====
On 17 July 2010, Anchorage was used as a target during RIMPAC for Maverick and Harpoon missiles fired from US Patrol Squadrons VP-5 and VP-40. After nearly 6 hours of being pounded by anti-ship cruise missiles and air dropped bombs, Anchorage would not sink and the Bremerton, was called in to finish the job. One well-placed torpedo lifted the ship out of the water and broke her keel. Nearly 22 minutes later, Anchorage slipped beneath the waves completing the final stage of the RIMPAC 2010 SINKEX.

== Notes ==
Citations

== Bibliography ==
Online sources

- "Anchorage I (LSD-36)". Dictionary of American Naval Fighting Ships. Naval History and Heritage Command. 16 June 2015.
