= USS Ashland =

USS Ashland may refer to the following ships of the United States Navy:

- USS Ashland (LSD-1), a dock landing ship, launched in 1942 and struck in 1969.
- USS Ashland (LSD-48), is a Whidbey Island-class dock landing ship, launched in 1989 and currently in service.
