= USS Germantown =

Two ships of the United States Navy have been named USS Germantown, after Germantown, Pennsylvania, the scene of an American Revolutionary War battle (Battle of Germantown).

- USS Germantown (1846) was a sloop, launched in 1846 and scuttled to avoid capture in 1861. She served briefly as a floating battery for the Confederate States of America
- USS Germantown (LSD-42) is a Whidbey Island-class dock landing ship currently in active service
