= USS Rushmore (LSD-47) =

US Navy dock landing ship

- USS Rushmore (LSD-47)

History

United States
- Name: USS Rushmore
- Namesake: Mount Rushmore National Memorial
- Ordered: 11 December 1985
- Builder: Avondale Shipyards
- Cost: $149 million
- Laid down: 9 November 1987
- Launched: 6 May 1989
- Sponsored by: Mrs. Meredith Brokaw
- Christened: 6 May 1989
- Commissioned: 1 June 1991
- Home port: Sasebo
- Motto: Nobility Power
- Status: in active service
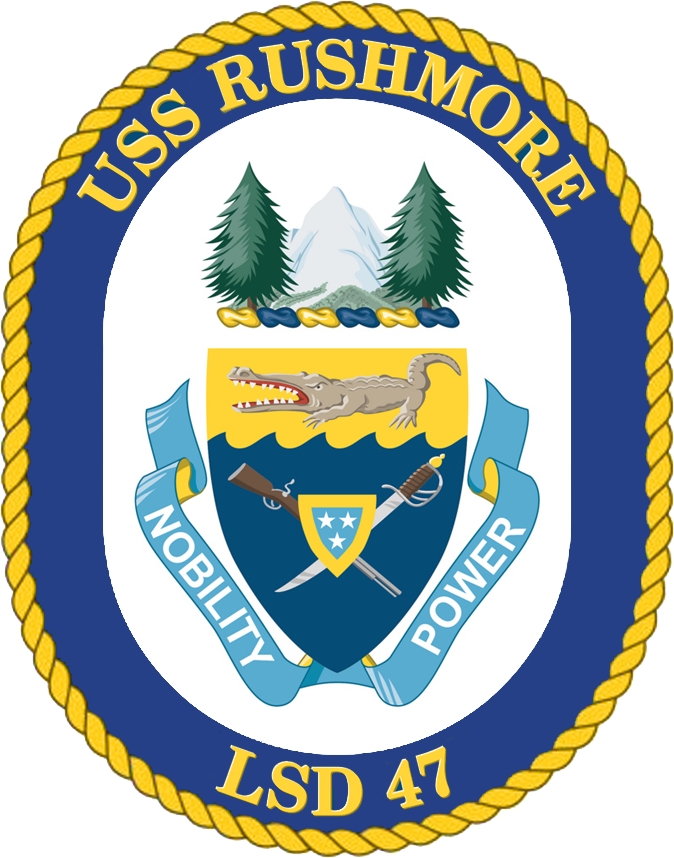
- Badge

General characteristics
- Class & type: Whidbey Island-class dock landing ship
- Displacement: 10,560 tons (light); 15,165 tons (full)
- Length: 609 ft (186 m)
- Beam: 84 ft (26 m)
- Draft: 20 ft (6.1 m)
- Installed power: 33,000 shp (25 MW)
- Propulsion: 4 Colt Industries, 16-cylinder diesel engines, 2 shafts
- Speed: 20+ knots (37+ km/h)
- Boats & landing craft carried: 4 LCAC or 3 Landing Craft Utility (on deck: 1 RHIB (7m), 1 RHIB (11m), and 1 LCPL)
- Troops: USMC Landing Force: 27 officers, 375 enlisted + 102 surge
- Crew: 22 officers, 391 enlisted
- Armament: 2 × 25 mm Mk 38 Mod 2 cannons; 2 × 20 mm Phalanx CIWS mounts; 2 × Rolling Airframe Missile; 6 × 0.5 in (12.7 mm) M2HB machine guns
- Aviation facilities: 2 helicopter landing spots

USS Rushmore (LSD-47) is a Whidbey Island-class dock landing ship of the United States Navy. She was the second navy ship to be named for the Mount Rushmore National Memorial in the Black Hills of South Dakota. She is the seventh ship in her class of dock landing ships and the fourth ship in that class to serve in the United States Pacific Fleet.

Rushmore was laid down on 9 November 1987, by the Avondale Shipyards, New Orleans; launched on 6 May 1989, sponsored by Mrs. Meredith Brokaw, wife of NBC News anchorman Tom Brokaw; and commissioned on 1 June 1991, at New Orleans.

== Mission ==
The assigned mission of the dock landing ship is to transport and launch loaded amphibious craft and vehicles with their crews and embarked personnel in amphibious assaults by landing craft and amphibious vehicles. It can render limited docking repair service to small ships and craft.

== General comments ==
The Whidbey Island-class dock landing ship provides for greater storage space of weapons and equipment, improved facilities for embarked troops, greater range of operations, and the capability to embark either conventional landing craft or LCAC. The ships incorporate materiel handling equipment including elevators, package/roller conveyors and forklifts, pallet transporters, and a turntable. The turntable is located between the well deck and the helicopter deck forward of the boat deck to assist in the rapid turnaround of vehicles and equipment during loading/offloading operations.

== History ==
=== 1990s ===
The ship's first assignment was to deliver three Air Cushioned Landing Craft (LCAC) to Camp Pendleton, California from Panama City, Florida. Along the way, Rushmore conducted a port visit in Jamaica, traversed the Panama Canal, and visited Rodman, Panama. Camp Pendleton was the last stop before arriving at her homeport of NS San Diego. During her first six-month deployment, Rushmore spearheaded the beach landing on Somalia during Operation Restore Hope. The largest military humanitarian operation in history, Restore Hope was designed to provide food and medical relief to the starving people of Somalia.

Rushmore's 1994 WestPac deployment came almost one year ahead of schedule. She deployed with only four weeks' notice and participated in Operation Support Hope off the coast of Mombasa, Kenya, the USLO relocation in Somalia, and exercises with forces of Oman and the United Arab Emirates. During this deployment, Rushmore also was awarded a Meritorious Unit Commendation.

Rushmore's 1996 deployment followed a complete and successful training cycle during which Rushmore earned the Blue E and the Battle E. This deployment provided numerous international training opportunities for the Tarawa Amphibious Readiness Group and the 13th Marine Expeditionary Unit (13th MEU) including Exercise Cobra Gold '96 with Thailand, Exercise Infinite Moonlight with Jordan, Exercise Red Reef with Saudi Arabia, and MEUEX '96 with Kuwait. Rushmore demonstrated its superior adaptability throughout deployment by becoming the first LSD-41-class ship to employ Rigid Hull Inflatable Boats (RHIBs) for the SPECWAR Detachment.

Rushmore concluded 1996 with a port visit to Mazatlán, Mexico. The ship earned its second consecutive Battle E in 1996.

Rushmore is the test platform for the Smart Ship program known as Gator 17. The ship was outfitted with several new technologies to reduce workload and manning levels. Information from the program aboard Rushmore will be used to assist in the design of the LPD-17 class amphibious ships. Installation was completed at the end of 1997.

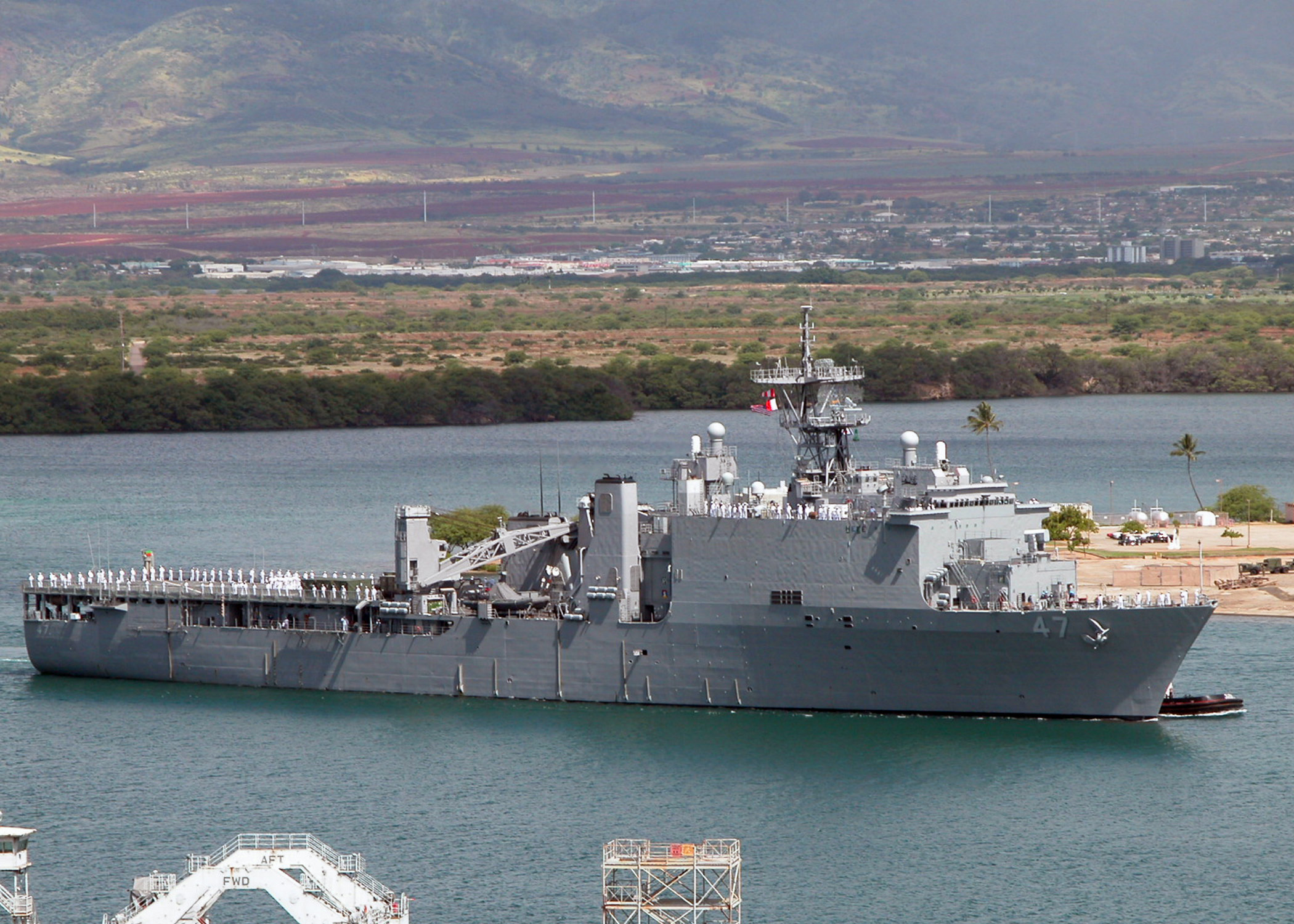
The USS Rushmore at NS Pearl Harbor during RIMPAC (2004).

Rushmore deployed in 1999 with the Peleliu Amphibious Ready Group and the 11th Marine Expeditionary Unit (11th MEU). During this deployment, Rushmore participated in Exercise Iron Magic with the United Arab Emirates and Exercise Red Reef with Saudi Arabia. Rushmore also had the distinction of becoming the first United States Naval warship to visit Doha, Qatar in 10 years. Other port visits included Japan, Thailand, Saudi Arabia, UAE, Singapore, Guam, Australia and Hawaii. On 12 March 1999, the ship made history when then Commander Michelle J. Howard (who later became the first-ever woman to achieve four-star rank in U.S. history, and would serve as Vice Chief of Naval Operations before assuming command of United States Naval Forces Europe and Naval Forces Africa, retiring in December 2017l) became its commanding officer and the first African American woman to Command a US Navy ship. Rushmore returned to San Diego in December 1999 and became the first "Smart Ship" to complete a six-month Western Pacific deployment.

=== 2000s ===
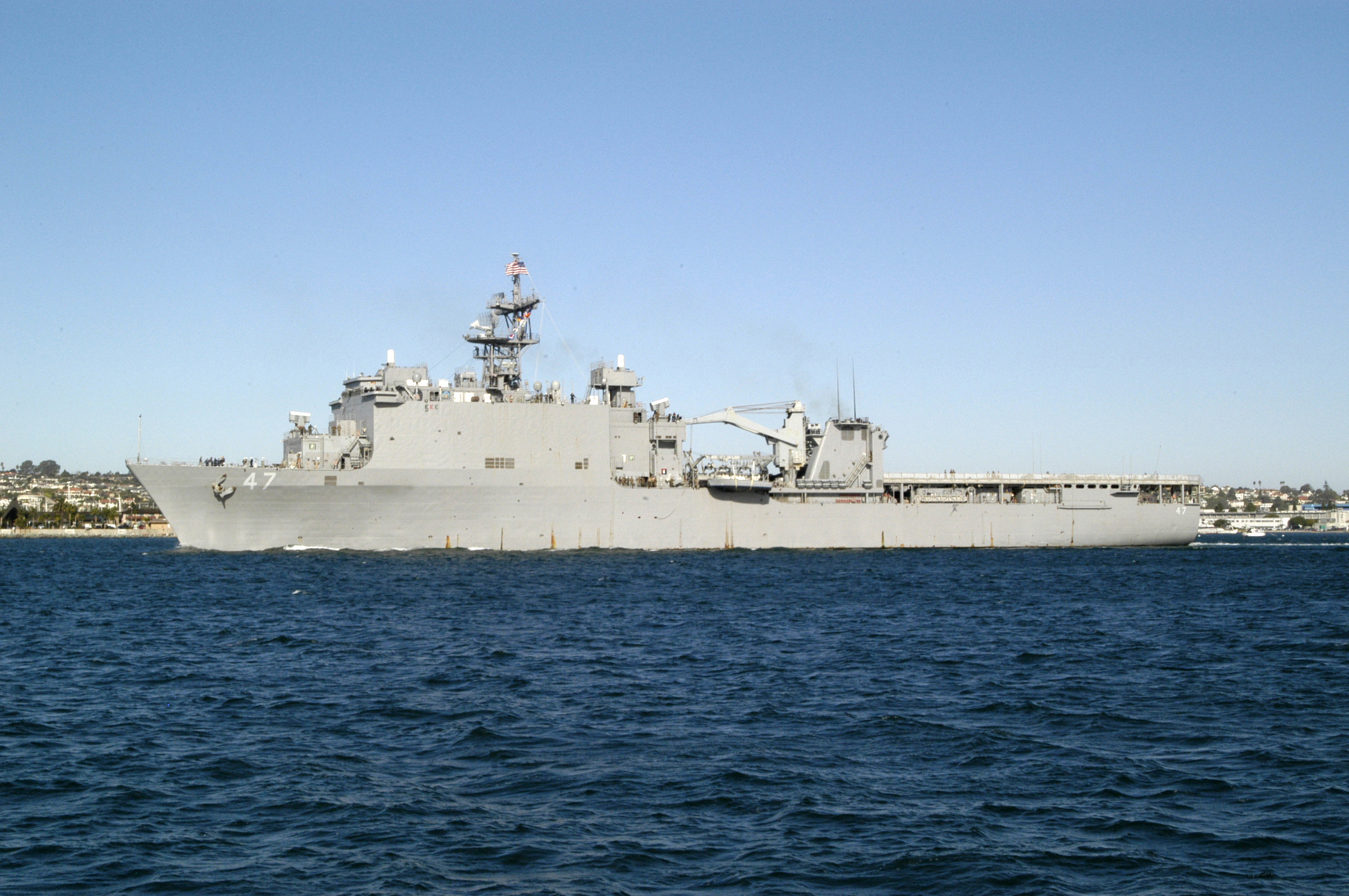
Rushmore sails out of San Diego, 6 January 2003.

With the new millennium, came a year of local operations for Rushmore. Rushmore participated in CARAT 2001 in cooperation with other navies in the Western Pacific, South China Sea and Southeast Asia. Returning home just days prior to the September 11 attacks, Rushmore began preparations to deploy to areas of national security interests. After coming out of "the yards" USS Rushmore participated in RIMPAC 2002 with a host of nations off the shores of Hawaii. The ship set sail January 6th 2003 in support of Operation Iraqi Freedom as part of the Tarawa Amphibious Ready Group (ARG). Transit back to San Diego included a port visit in Cairns, Australia, crossing the equator at the international date line (making sailors 'Golden Shellbacks), Pearl Harbor, Hawaii, then returned to home port 13 July 2003. The congressionally mandated inspection, INSURV, was conducted and failed directly following deployment. The ship then went in to dry dock for scheduled maintenance and repair.

The ship deployed on 6 December 2004 once again in support of Operation Iraqi Freedom as part of the Bonhomme Richard Expeditionary Strike Group (ESG 5). On the way to the Fifth Fleet Area of Responsibility, the 2004 Indian Ocean earthquake and tsunami occurred, which would change the course of Rushmore and begin a massive U.S. military humanitarian operation, dubbed Operation Unified Assistance. The tsunami that flooded parts of Southeast Asia took the lives of more than 100,000 people in a matter of hours. USS Rushmore and the elements of Expeditionary Strike Group Five were called into action.

The ship became an afloat staging base for military helicopters to refuel and transport supplies. USS Rushmore launched both LCACs bringing tons of food and water ashore for distribution to survivors. Once the operation ended, Rushmore reset a course to the Persian Gulf to support Maritime Security Operations, and help defend Iraq's Kwar Al Amaya and Al Basra Oil Platforms. The Marines of the 15th Marine Expeditionary Unit deployed to Kuwait, and went further north into areas of Iraq before they were brought back on board in early April.

Rushmore sailors enjoyed two port visits during their two months in the Persian Gulf, one visit to the Mid-Eastern country of Bahrain, the other, a trip to the port of Jebel Ali, United Arab Emirates. During the transit home, Rushmore stopped for a port visit to Cairns, Australia. Rushmore returned to the ship's homeport of San Diego, California on 6 June 2005.

The ship completed a three-month maintenance period and participated in Exercise Rim of the Pacific (RIMPAC) off the coast of Hawaii from June to August 2006.

Rushmore began 2007 by completing work ups with the Bonhomme Richard (ESG 5). They loaded more than 400 Marines of the 13th MEU onboard along with their equipment to prepare for the transit to the Middle East.

On 16 February 2007, Rushmore was awarded the 2006 Battle "E" award.

As 10 April 2007 arrived Rushmore was ready to get underway for deployment to the Middle East. Rushmore visited several different ports, including Guam, Singapore, Jebel Ali, Dubai and Bahrain.

On 1 December 2007, Rushmore became the first ship since the September 11 terrorist attacks to host a United States Navy open house while inport Seal Beach, California. Thousands showed up to tour the ship. The crew took visitors through the bridge, medical center, Combat Information Center, and other external places on the ship.

Rushmore certified in ULTRA-C in May 2008 and sailed up to Seattle, Washington, to take part in the Centennial Celebration of the Great White Fleet on 22 May. She participated in a parade of ships and later hosted tours to both the general public and guests for the gala. In late September 2008, Rushmore sailed to Esquimalt, British Columbia, Canada, to serve as the test platform for developing ASW systems in the Nanoose Firing Range. While there, Rushmore had a three-day port visit and was hosted by HMCS Regina (FFH 334).

Upon their return home, Rushmore finalized their preparations for the Congressionally-mandated Navy's Board of Inspection and Survey (INSURV) on 27 October 2008. She also underwent ULTRA-E in November 2008.

=== 2010s ===
On 12 July 2012, Rushmore successfully completed its material inspection by the navy's Board of Inspection and Survey (INSURV) assessment and was found fit for sustained combat operations.

On 17 September 2012, Rushmore departed San Diego on a 7-month deployment with USS Peleliu, and USS Green Bay under the command of Amphibious Squadron (PHIBRON)Three and with the 15th Marine Expeditionary Unit embarked as the Landing Force. This deployment to the Western Pacific and Indian Ocean included a brief port visit at Pearl Harbor, Hawaii; participation in Exercise Crocodilo in Timor-Leste; a port visit at Darwin, Australia; participation in Exercise Eager Mace in Kuwait; a brief port visit to Naval Support Activity Bahrain; participation in Exercise Iron Magic in UAE; participation in Exercise Red Reef in Saudi Arabia; a visit to Port Kahlifa near Abu Dhabi, UAE; an equipment washdown and agricultural inspection in Aqaba, Jordan; a visit to Hong Kong; and a second visit to Pearl Harbor during the return transit.

In June 2015, Rushmore made news for rescuing 65 people who were stranded on a makeshift raft in the Makassar Strait after their ferry capsized.

=== 2020s ===
In 2021, Rushmore conducted a homeport shift from San Diego to Sasebo, Japan, arriving on November 17, 2021. Rushmore replaced USS Germantown as part of Amphibious Squadron 11.

In 2025, Rushmore, as part of the America Amphibious Ready Group (ARG), participated in Amphibious Integration Training (AIT) and Certification Exercise (CERTEX) with the 31st Marine Expeditionary Unit (MEU), and exercise Iron Fist 2025, embarking Japanese soldiers from the Japan Ground Self-Defense Force's Amphibious Rapid Deployment Brigade, 1st Amphibious Rapid Deployment Regiment, 1st Company. During AIT/CERTEX, Rushmore became the first ship in Seventh Fleet to launch and recover Amphibious Combat Vehicles (ACVs).

On 19 March 2026, Newsmax reported that Rushmore might join the Tripoli Amphibious Ready Group to support the Operation Epic Fury in the Middle East. This will be a replacement for USS San Diego which, located in the Philippine Sea, will head back to the Pacific for maintenance after accompanying Tripoli and New Orleans.
