= List of Palestinian rocket attacks on Israel in 2013 =

The following is a detailed list of Palestinian rocket and mortar attacks on Israel in 2013. All of the attacks originated in the Gaza Strip, unless stated otherwise. For information pertaining to the wider conflict, see Arab–Israeli conflict and Israeli–Palestinian conflict. Over the year 52 rockets and 16 mortars were fired at Israel, the vast majority of which came from the Gaza strip. This was the fewest such attacks since 2001.

== Summary ==
This strictly summarises the content of the article below.

Month	Missiles launched		Effect of missiles		Retaliation by Israel	
	Rockets	Mortars	Killed	Injured	Killed	Injured
January						
February	1					
March	4					
April	17	5			1	
May	1	4				
June	5					
July	5	2				
August	4					
September	8					
October	3	2				
November		5				
December	4					
Total	52	18	0	0	1	0

== January ==
There were no Palestinian rocket attacks on Israel in January.

== February ==
In February, Palestinians fired one rocket into Israel.

February 26

Palestinians fired an M-75 medium-range rocket at the Israeli city of Ashkelon. The militant wing of Fatah, the party of Palestinian President Mahmoud Abbas, claimed responsibility, calling the attack a response to the death of Palestinian man Arafat Jaradat while in Israeli custody. The attack, which took place during an escalation of Palestinian violence against Israelis in the Fatah-controlled West Bank, was said to be the first of its kind since a 21 November 2012 truce and to have probably enjoyed the blessing of Hamas. Hamas denied that any rocket had been fired from the Gaza Strip.

== March ==
In March, Palestinians fired four rockets at Israel in one attack.

March 21

Around 7:15 am, on the second day of a visit by US President Barack Obama in Israel, Palestinians in Beit Hanoun fired four rockets at the Israeli city of Sderot, triggering alarms in local communities and forcing residents on their way to work or school to run to bomb shelters. One rocket hit the backyard of a home in the city, spraying shrapnel into the walls and shattering windows. A second projectile landed in an open area within the surrounding Sha'ar Hanegev Regional Council. The two remaining rockets were believed to have landed within the Gaza Strip. No injuries were reported.

The Mujahedeen Shura Council, a Palestinian Salafi group, claimed responsibility for the attack, stating that it was meant to show that Israeli air defenses could not stop attacks on the Jewish state. "Responding to the bragging of the Roman dog and the war criminals of their so-called Iron Dome, we assert that all their military techniques will not stop God's destiny of tormenting them", the group posted on an Islamist website.

On 2 April, police found what were apparently the remains of a third rocket in a kindergarten in Sderot. The rocket had not been located previously because the kindergarten had been closed for the Passover holiday.

== April ==
In April, Palestinians fired 17 rockets and 5 mortar shells at Israel in 13 separate attacks. Two of the rockets were fired from Egypt.

April 2

Palestinians attempted to fire two mortar shells into Israel; both landed within the Gaza Strip. Later, in the evening, a third projectile was fired into the Eshkol Regional Council. No injuries or damage were reported.

The Mujahedeen Shura Council claimed responsibility for the attacks, saying they were a response to the death of Palestinian man Maysara Abuhamdia that day while in Israeli custody. The 64-year-old Abuhamdia, who was serving a life sentence for his role in a foiled plot to blow up a busy Jerusalem cafe in 2002, died of throat cancer at the Soroka Medical Center in Beersheba, Israel. His death also sparked violence by Palestinians in East Jerusalem and the West Bank.

Israel responded to the attacks with air strikes on two targets in the Gaza Strip that night, causing no injuries. This was the first such strike since Operation Pillar of Defense. Israeli Defense Minister Moshe Yaalon said: "[W]e see Hamas as being responsible for everything that is fired from the Strip at Israel. We won't allow any routine involving a drizzle of rockets at our civilians and forces."

April 3

Around 7:30 am, Palestinians fired two rockets at the Israeli city of Sderot. The rockets struck just as parents were dropping their children off at schools and kindergartens, triggering sirens and sending families fleeing for cover. No injuries or damage were reported.

United Nations special envoy to the Middle East Robert Serry condemned the "indiscriminate firing of rockets into civilian areas" and also called on Israel to exercise restraint. France said it "harshly condemns" the rocket fire on the "civilian population in south Israel". Israeli Prime Minister Benjamin Netanyahu said: "If the quiet is violated, we will respond strongly".

The Mujahedeen Shura Council claimed responsibility for the attack. The group also alleged that the Palestinian Hamas regime in Gaza arrested two of its members in response. Hamas denied detaining the militants, saying: "Our security apparatus is part of the resistance [i.e., warfare against Israel] and does not arrest anyone who resists the occupation. On the contrary, we encourage resistance."

April 4

In the early morning, Palestinians fired a rocket and three mortar shells at Israel. The rocket landed in an open area in the Eshkol Regional Council at around 2 am, triggering alarms in nearby communities, while two of the mortars fell within the Gaza Strip. No injuries or damage were reported.

Israeli envoy to the UN Ron Prosor called on the United Nations Security Council to condemn the rocket attacks, writing: "The time has come for the Security Council to begin to worry for the safety of Israeli citizens as well".

April 7

In the evening, as Israelis began observance of the annual Holocaust Remembrance Day and during a visit by US Secretary of State John Kerry in the region, Palestinians fired three rockets at Israel. One exploded in an open area in the Sha'ar Hanegev Regional Council. The other two were believed to have fallen within the Gaza Strip. No injuries or damage were reported.

Following the attack, Israel partially closed its border crossings with the Gaza Strip, while keeping the Erez crossing open for humanitarian passage. Israel completely reopened the crossings on 12 April.

April 17

Around 9 am, two 122 mm Grad rockets were fired at the Israeli resort city of Eilat on the Red Sea coast, triggering alarms. The rockets were believed to have been fired from Egypt's adjacent Sinai Peninsula. One of the rockets exploded in a construction site in the residential neighborhood of Shahamon, while the other fell adjacent to the main hotel strip, near the Jordanian border. No physical injuries or damage were reported, but a number of residents suffered from acute stress reaction. The attack forced a temporary complete closure of Eilat Airport. An Iron Dome battery that had been stationed by the city did not intercept the rockets. Two rockets also landed in Jordan's neighboring resort city of Aqaba.

The Mujahideen Shura Council claimed responsibility for the attack, saying they had targeted "occupied Eilat" [sic] as a "response to the continued suffering of the downtrodden prisoners in Israeli jails".

Israeli Prime Minister Binyamin Netanyahu said that Israel would respond to the attack, as was the country's consistent policy for the past four years.

April 18

Around 11 pm, Palestinians fired two rockets into the Eshkol Regional Council. No injuries or damage were reported. The Color Red alarm failed to sound.

April 21

Before daybreak, Palestinians fired a rocket into the Eshkol Regional Council, triggering sirens in nearby towns and forcing residents into bomb shelters. No injuries or damage were reported.

April 27

On the evening of the Jewish Lag BaOmer holiday, Palestinians fired a rocket into the Sdot Negev Regional Council. The projectile exploded near a residential area but caused no injuries or damage. Israeli children who were celebrating the holiday with bonfires were instructed to return home.

Israel responded to the attack with air strikes on two sites in the southern Gaza Strip belonging to the militant wing of the Democratic Front for the Liberation of Palestine: a training facility and a weapons storage site, causing no injuries. It also temporarily closed the Kerem Shalom border crossing between Israel and the Gaza Strip for commercial goods, keeping it open exclusively for humanitarian passage. The Israel Defense Forces stated that it "will not tolerate any attempt to harm Israeli civilians, and will not allow for a return to the reality before Pillar of Defense where Israeli civilians are threatened".

April 29

Before daybreak, Palestinians fired a rocket into the Eshkol Regional Council. The projectile exploded in an open area and caused no injuries or damage. The Color Red alarm sounded in nearby communities.

April 30

The Palestinian Ansar Brigades claimed to have launched 5 mortar shells at the Israeli towns of Kerem Shalom and Holit (in the Eshkol Regional Council). No mortar hits were observed in Israel, however, and it was suggested that the projectiles all fell within the Gaza Strip. The Palestinian group said the attacks on the towns were a response to Israel's targeted killing of Haitham al-Mishal, a terrorist involved in the recent rocket attack on Eilat. "The occupation does not respect the truce nor fulfill its commitments," the group said in a statement. "The truce can go to hell."

== May ==
In May, Palestinians carried out three attacks on Israel, firing 1 rocket and four mortars.

May 2

In the evening, Palestinians fired two mortar shells into the Eshkol Regional Council. The projectiles landed in open areas, causing no injuries or damage.

May 15

As Israelis celebrated the holiday of Shavuot, Palestinians fired a rocket into the Eshkol Regional Council, triggering the Color Red alarm. The projectile landed in an open area, causing no injuries or damage. The attack occurred as Palestinians marked Nakba Day and coincided with widespread Palestinian violence against Israelis in Jerusalem and the West Bank.

In a separate incident that took place in the morning, two mortar shells were fired from Syria at Mount Hermon in the Israeli-occupied Golan Heights. The shells landed in open areas, causing no injuries or damage, but forcing a closure of the area to hikers for several hours. A previously unknown Palestinian Islamist group calling itself the Abdul al-Qadir al-Husseini Brigades claimed responsibility for the launchings, saying that its motive was "avenging all our martyrs that we lost in our war with the Zionist enemy". Mortar shells fired from Syria had landed in the Israeli-occupied Golan Heights in several previous incidents, but all of these were presumed to be accidental fallout from the Syrian civil war.

== June ==
In June, Palestinians launched 5 rockets at Israel in 3 separate attacks.

June 19

Around 5:40 am, as world leaders were gathered in Jerusalem to celebrate the 90th birthday of Israeli President Shimon Peres, Palestinian terrorists fired one to three rockets toward the coastal city of Ashkelon, triggering sirens in the city and in surrounding communities. The rockets apparently landed within the Gaza Strip, and no injuries or damage were reported.

June 23/24

Overnight, Palestinians fired rockets at the city of Netivot, the Bnei Shimon Regional Council, and the Ashkelon Coast Regional Council. Two of the projectiles were intercepted by Iron Dome. Air raid sirens sounded as far as Beersheba, Rahat and Lahavim. No injuries or damage were reported. Palestinian Islamic Jihad was believed to be behind the attacks, and their motivation was thought to be internal tension in the Gaza Strip after an Islamic Jihad leader was killed by Hamas police the previous day.

Israel responded the same night with air strikes on two arms depots in the central Gaza Strip, a rocket launching site, and a terror activity site in the southern part of the Strip. It also temporarily closed the Kerem Shalom and Erez border crossings between Israel and Gaza for commercial passage.

== July ==
In July, Palestinians launched 5 rockets and 2 mortars at Israel in 6 separate attacks. Five of the rockets were fired from the Gaza Strip and two originated from the Sinai Peninsula in Egypt.

July 4

A rocket was fired from Egypt at Eilat. Israelis reported hearing several explosions in the area, and the remains of a rocket were found five days later.

July 18

In the evening, Palestinians fired two rockets at the Eshkol Regional Council. No injuries or damage were reported.

July 21

Around 10 pm, Palestinians fired a rocket into the Eshkol Regional Council. The rocket landed in open area, causing no injuries or damage. The Color Red alarm sounded.

July 24

Around 10 am, Palestinians fired two mortar shells at the Eshkol Regional Council. The mortars landed within the Gaza Strip and caused no injuries or damage. The Color Red alarm did not sound.

July 30

On the day that Israel and the Palestinian Authority resumed peace talks after a three-year hiatus, Palestinians launched a rocket into the Sha'ar Hanegev Regional Council, triggering sirens in the region. No injuries or damage were reported.

== August ==
In August, Palestinians in Gaza launched 3 rockets at Israel in 3 separate attacks. A fourth rocket was launched from the Sinai Peninsula in Egypt.

August 13

In the evening, Palestinians fired two rockets at Sderot. One exploded in an open area outside the city, triggering sirens, and another fell within the Gaza Strip. No injuries or damage were reported. The incident occurred just as Israel was releasing, as a concession in the renewed peace talks, a group of Palestinian prisoners convicted of murder, and less than 24 hours after Islamist militants in Egypt fired a Grad rocket at the Israeli resort town of Eilat. Israel responded with air strikes on rocket launching sites in the northern Gaza Strip.

== September ==
In September, Palestinians fired eight rockets at Israel in 3 attacks.

September 19

Shortly after 2 am, as Israelis were celebrating the holiday of Sukkot, Palestinians fired a rocket into the Ashkelon Coast Regional Council, triggering the Code Red alarm throughout the area. No injuries were reported.

September 28

Around 1 am, Palestinians fired a rocket into the Ashkelon Coast Regional Council, near the Ashkelon port. The Code Red alarm sounded and no injuries or damage were reported.

== October ==
In October, Palestinians fired three rockets and two mortar shells at Israel Israel in three separate attacks.

October 9

Around 1 am, Palestinians fired a rocket into the Eshkol Regional Council. The Code Red alarm sounded and no injuries or damage were reported.

October 27

At 1:15 pm, Palestinians fired two rockets into the Eshkol Regional Council. No injuries or damage were reported.

October 28

Around 5 am, Palestinians fired two rockets into the Ashkelon Coast Regional Council and the city of Ashkelon. One rocket was shot down by the Iron dome system, the second fell in an open area. The Code Red alarm sounded and no injuries or damage were reported. The attack coincided with the publication of a list of 26 Palestinian prisoners convicted of murdering Israelis who were to be released by Israel as a good faith measure towards the Palestinian Authority. Israel responded to the attack with air strikes on two rocket launchers in the Gaza Strip.

== November ==
In November, Palestinians fired five mortar shells at Israel in four separate attacks.

== December ==
In December, Palestinians fired four rockets at Israel in four separate attacks.

December 23

Just after midnight, Palestinians fired a rocket into a town in the Ashkelon Coast Regional Council. The projectile exploded near a children's bus stop, causing damage but no injuries. The Color Red alarm sounded throughout the region, and residents reported hearing a large blast. Hamas, the Palestinian Islamist group that controls the Gaza Strip, neither confirmed nor denied responsibility for the attack.

December 26

Shortly after midnight, Palestinians fired a rocket towards the Ashkelon Coast Regional Council, causing the Color Red alarm to sound in the area. The projectile apparently landed within the Gaza Strip. No injuries or damage were reported.

Around 19:50, Palestinians fired a rocket towards the Eshkol Regional Council, causing the Color Red alarm to sound in the area. No injuries or damage were reported.
