= USS Tortuga (LSD-46) =

1988 Whidbey Island-class dock landing ship

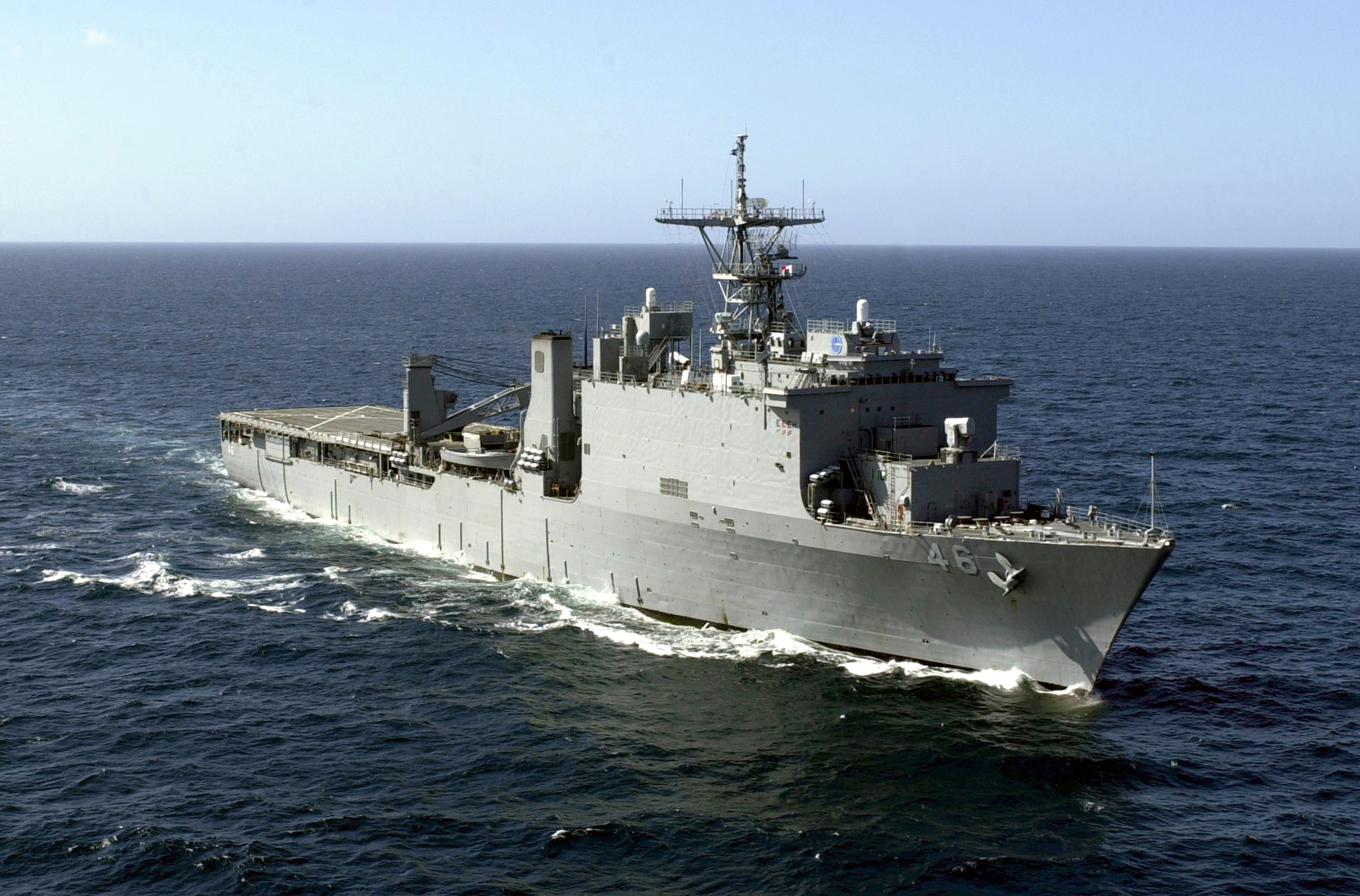
- USS Tortuga (LSD-46)

History

United States
- Name: USS Tortuga
- Namesake: Dry Tortugas
- Ordered: 26 November 1984
- Builder: Avondale Shipyards
- Laid down: 23 March 1987
- Launched: 15 September 1988
- Christened: 19 November 1988
- Commissioned: 17 November 1990
- Home port: Little Creek, Virginia
- Motto: Tough, Tall, Tenacious
- Status: in active service
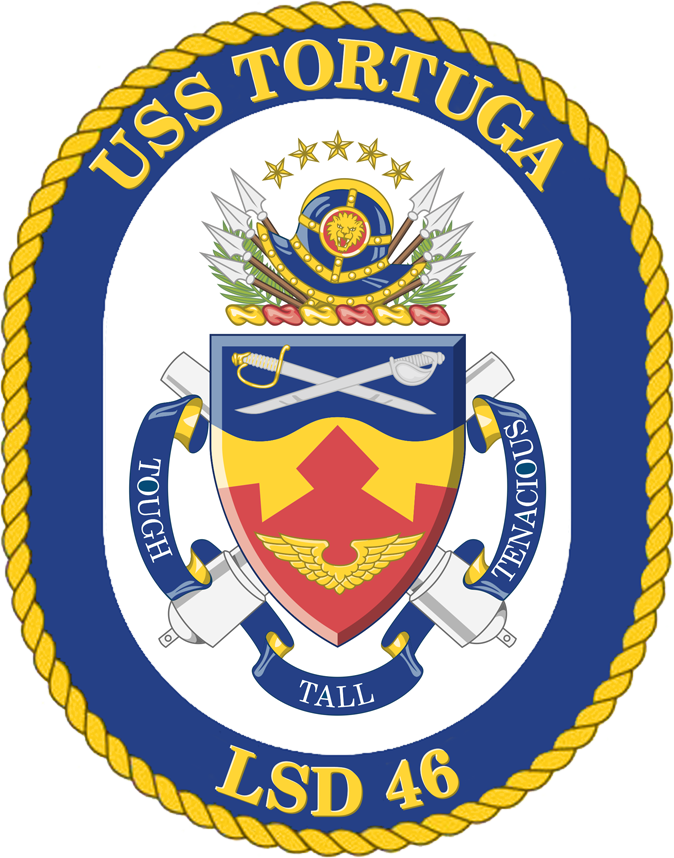
- Badge

General characteristics
- Class & type: Whidbey Island-class dock landing ship
- Displacement: 11,471 tons (light); 16,568 tons (full)
- Length: 610 ft (190 m)
- Beam: 84 ft (26 m)
- Draft: 21 ft (6.4 m)
- Propulsion: 4 Colt Industries, 16-cylinder diesel engines, 2 shafts, 33,000 shp (25,000 kW)
- Speed: over 20 knots (37 km/h; 23 mph)
- Boats & landing craft carried: 5 LCACs or 21 LCM-6s
- Troops: Marine detachment: 402 + 102 surge
- Complement: 22 officers, 391 enlisted
- Armament: 2 × 25 mm Mk 38 cannons; 2 × 20 mm Phalanx CIWS mounts; 2 × Rolling Airframe Missile; 6 × .50 caliber M2HB machine guns

USS Tortuga (LSD-46) is a Whidbey Island-class dock landing ship of the United States Navy. She was the second Navy ship to be named for the Dry Tortugas, a group of desert coral islets 60 miles (97 km) west of Key West, Florida.

Tortuga was laid down on 23 March 1987, by the Avondale Shipyards, New Orleans, Louisiana. The threat of Hurricane Gilbert in the Gulf of Mexico forced an early launching of the ship, as a precautionary measure, on 15 September 1988. On 19 November 1988, Mrs. Rosemary Parker Schoultz, the ship's sponsor, presided over the christening ceremony, breaking the traditional bottle of champagne over the bow of the ship. Tortuga was commissioned on 17 November 1990.

== History ==
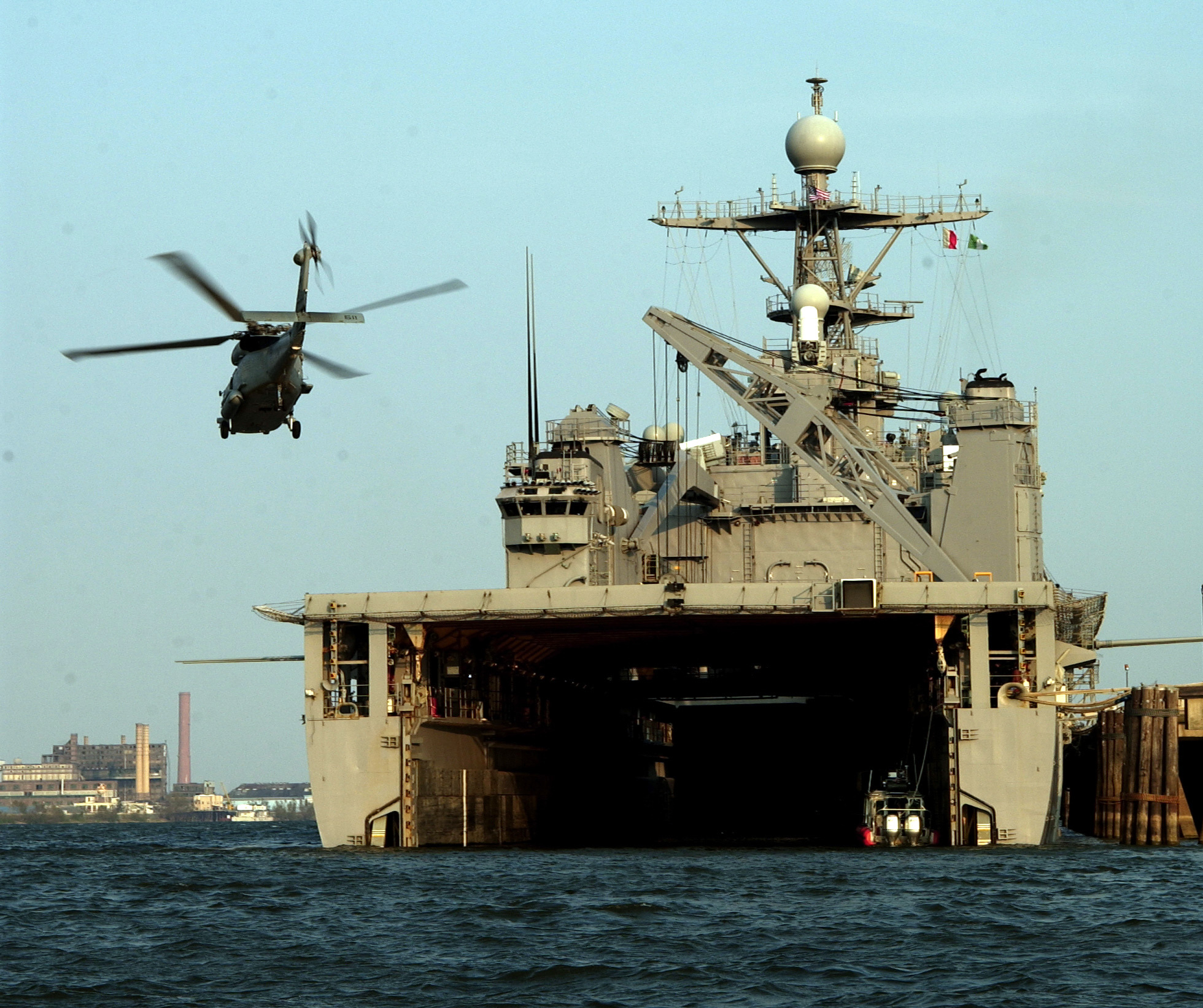
Tortuga in September 2005, moored pier side in New Orleans during Hurricane Katrina relief efforts

In 1997, Tortuga was commanded by Commander Kenneth M. Rome, and made a Mediterranean deployment from 1 July 1998 until 8 December 1998. In 1999, Commander J.M. Burdon assumed command and commanded the ship until his retirement in late 2000. He was succeeded by Commander James P. Driscoll, and in October 2000, the ship was ordered on an emergency deployment to support UNITAS 2000 in the South Pacific after USS La Moure County had run aground on an underwater mountain off the coast of Valparaíso, Chile suffering catastrophic damage. After successfully finishing the UNITAS deployment, Tortuga returned to Little Creek. In January 2001, Tortuga was assigned as flagship to the Standing Naval Forces Atlantic a NATO peacekeeping/quick reaction force.

In August 2002, Tortuga departed North Carolina with marines and sailors from BLT 2/2. During this time she was the home to Echo Company, CAAT Red and a section of CAAT Green, as well as LAR and AmTracks. The group was on what was supposed to be a six-month deployment. In September and October 2002, Tortuga was in Thessaloniki, Greece in support of BLT 2/2 operations in Kosovo. In November Tortuga transited the Suez Canal with the rest of her ARG. They were then assigned to the U.S. Fifth Fleet. In mid-November, Tortuga put Marines from BLT 2/2 ashore in Djibouti. She then proceeded south of the equator to the Seychelle Islands. In March 2003, Tortuga proceeded to the Persian Gulf to deploy her Marines and sailors in support of Operation Iraqi Freedom. The Marines and sailors returned to Tortuga in April and returned to the United States on 27 May 2003 after a 9-month deployment.

In 2005, Tortuga was commanded by Commander Mark H. Scovill, homeported at NAB Little Creek, Virginia, and assigned to Amphibious Group 2 of the Atlantic Fleet.

On 25 August 2005 Tortuga and her crew were pulled from a training exercise and sent to New Orleans to become part of Joint Task Force Katrina. She was the first Navy warship to sail up the Mississippi River following the hurricane and berthed on the West Bank of New Orleans Naval Station. The ship instantly became a major rally point for the scattered military and civilian forces across New Orleans. Tortuga's crew conducted rescue missions in the flooded Ninth Ward and assisted local officials from St. Bernard Parish. Crew members employed combat rubber raiding craft (CRRCs) which allowed them to search flooded areas with many underwater obstacles. As the crew rescued people from neighborhoods they were brought back to Tortuga with 7 and 11 meter RHIBs. Evacuees were processed, received medical attention, and were forwarded to their next destination at the earliest possible time. As water receded in New Orleans and the CRRCs became useless, the ship served as the headquarters for the 618th ESC "Nasty", and the 307th Engineer Battalion, 82nd Airborne Division U.S. Army camped out on the Naval Station, while they worked in conjunction with U.S. Navy units to conduct rescue and clean up missions.

On 14 October 2005, the U.S. Navy announced that Tortuga would be forward-deployed to Sasebo, Japan to replace USS Fort McHenry. Tortuga arrived in Sasebo 31 March 2006 for turnover and assignment as part of the U.S. Navy's Forward Deployed Naval Forces (FDNF). On 12 April the crews of the two ships completed an exchange-of-command process. Conducted in 12 days, the hull swap between Fort McHenry and Tortuga was the quickest in the history of the U.S. Navy. Tortuga's former crew departed Sasebo on 13 April 2006 to return to Little Creek on board Fort McHenry.

On 15 May, only a month following the swap, Tortuga departed for a three-month deployment. The deployment was centered around an annual exercise called Cooperation Afloat Readiness and Training (CARAT) 2006. Tortuga joined a newly established task group (TG 73.5) reporting directly to Commander, Logistics Group WESTPAC out of Singapore. The group consisted of five ships, Tortuga, the destroyer Hopper, the frigate Crommelin, the supply ship USNS Salvor, and the United States Coast Guard vessel USCGC Sherman. The group visited and operated with the navies of Singapore, Thailand, Indonesia, Malaysia, Brunei, and Philippines.

USS Tortuga visited the island of Iwo Jima in March 2008 and March 2010 to celebrate the anniversary of the World War II battle fought there.

In 2011, Tortuga reinforced a company sized element of United States Marines, in direct support of Operation Enduring Freedom, with some receiving hostile fire/hostile fire pay.

Tortuga participated in disaster relief after the 2011 Tōhoku earthquake and tsunami. As part of Operation Tomodachi, the ship transported Japanese Self-Defense Force personnel and equipment from Hokkaido to Honshu island. Divers from the ship helped map and clear debris from the ports of Hachinohe, Aomori and Miyako, Iwate, facilitating both ports to reopen to ship traffic.

From 5 to 7 April 2013, Tortuga participated in a joint annual military exercises together with the Armed Forces of the Philippines to enhance regional cooperation and effectiveness in the region. More than 8,000 personnel will be conducted the Balikatan exercises.

In August 2013, Tortuga completed a hull swap with USS Ashland and then returned to her new homeport of Little Creek, Virginia.

On 13 March 2026 USS Tortuga departed Naval Station Norfolk following a 10.5 year maintenance availability.
