= Tawhid wal-Jihad =

Tawhid wal-Jihad or may refer to:

- Jahafil Al-Tawhid Wal-Jihad fi Filastin, an Islamist group in Gaza
- Jama'at al-Tawhid wal-Jihad, a predecessor to Al Qaeda in Iraq and the Islamic State of Iraq and the Levant
- Tawhid and Jihad in West Africa, an offshoot of Al-Qaeda in the Islamic Maghreb

== See also ==
- Abu Muhammad al-Maqdisi, a militant Salafi jihadi cleric who popularised the term Tawhid wal-Jihad
