= USS Fort McHenry =

Whidbey Island-class dock landing ship

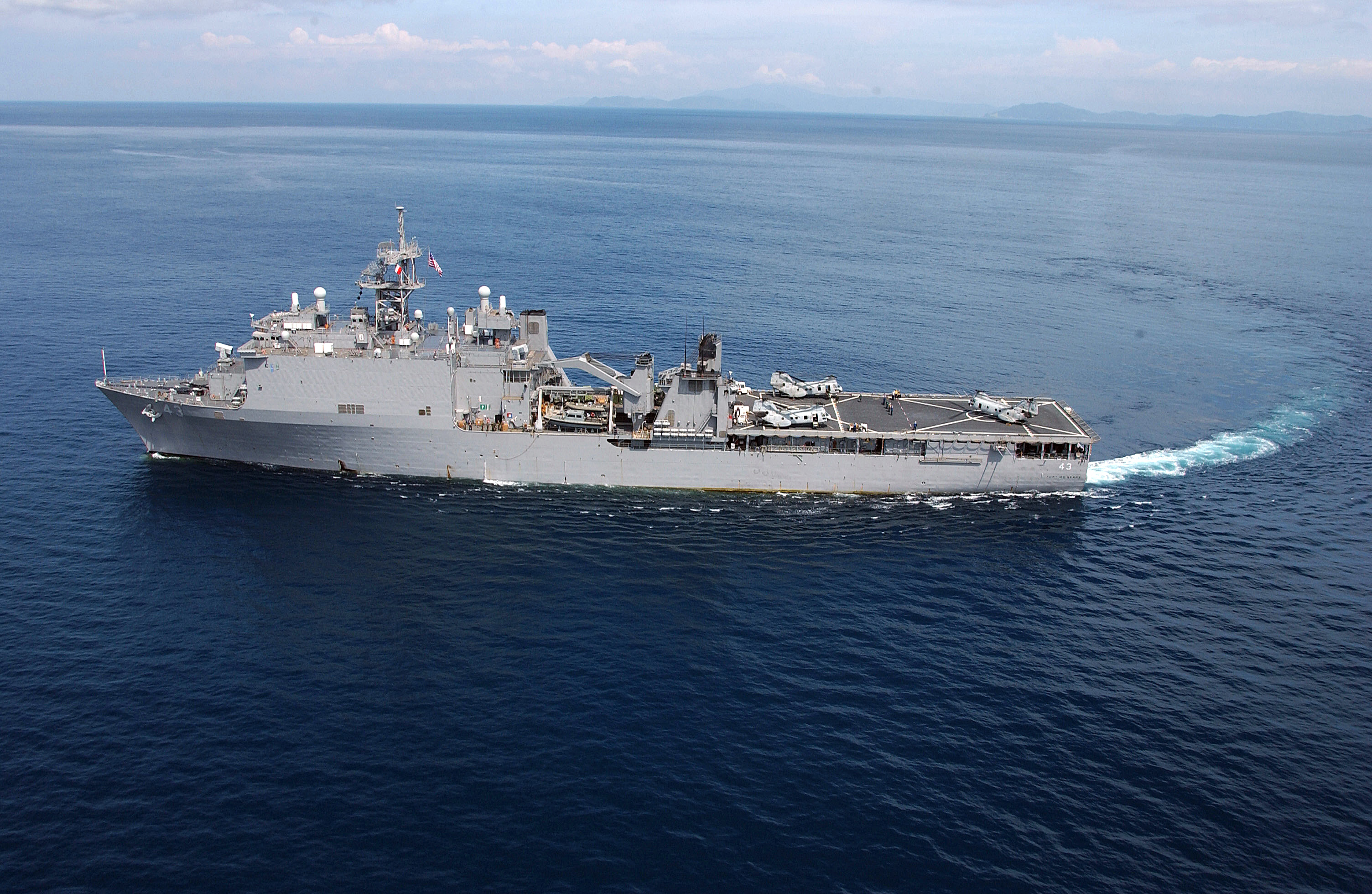
- USS Fort McHenry (LSD-43) conducting helicopter operations off the coast of Sumatra in 2005

History

United States
- Name: Fort McHenry
- Namesake: Fort McHenry, in Baltimore, Maryland
- Ordered: 11 December 1985
- Builder: Lockheed Shipbuilding
- Laid down: 10 June 1983
- Launched: 1 February 1986
- Commissioned: 8 August 1987
- Decommissioned: 27 March 2021
- Identification: Callsign: NHTB; Hull number LSD-43
- Motto: Domus Fortium "Home of the Brave" translated from Latin
- Fate: Towed to scrap
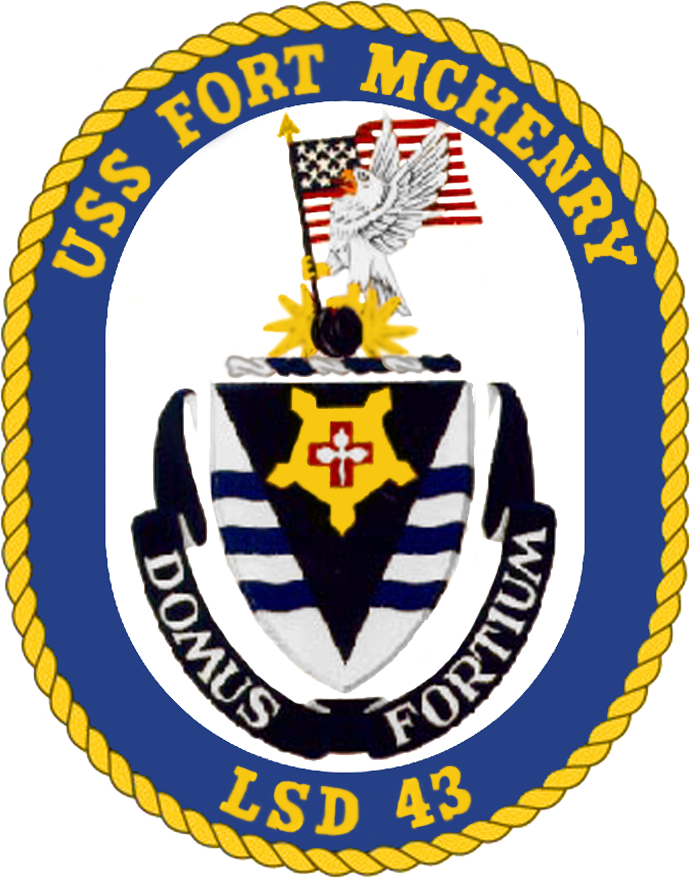
- Badge

General characteristics
- Class & type: Whidbey Island-class dock landing ship
- Displacement: 16,261 long tons (16,522 t) (full); 11,325 long tons (11,507 t) (light)
- Length: 610 ft (185.9 m)
- Beam: 84 ft (25.6 m)
- Draft: 21 ft (6.4 m)
- Installed power: 33,000 shp (25 MW)
- Propulsion: 4 Colt Industries, 16-cylinder diesel engines, 2 shafts
- Speed: 20+ knots (37+ km/h)
- Boats & landing craft carried: 5 LCACs or 21 LCM-6s
- Troops: Marine detachment: 402 + 102 surge
- Complement: 22 officers, 391 enlisted
- Armament: 2 × 25 mm Mk 38 cannons; 2 × 20 mm Phalanx CIWS mounts; 2 × Rolling Airframe Missile; 6 × .50 caliber M2HB machine guns

USS Fort McHenry (LSD-43) is a Whidbey Island-class dock landing ship of the United States Navy. She was named for Fort McHenry, in Baltimore, Maryland, the 1814 defense of which inspired "The Star-Spangled Banner".

Fort McHenry was laid down on 10 June 1983 by Lockheed Shipbuilding in Seattle, Washington. She was launched on 1 February 1986 and commissioned on 8 August 1987 in Seattle.

Fort McHenry was decommissioned on 27 March 2021 and as of April 2021 is undergoing transfer to the Naval Inactive Ship Maintenance Facility in Philadelphia, Pennsylvania, where she will be placed in reserve status.

== History ==
=== 1988 – 1995 ===
Fort McHenry's maiden deployment was from June 1988 to December 1988 to the Western Pacific. Following her return, Fort McHenry participated in the cleanup of the Exxon Valdez oil spill from 28 April – 22 June 1989. In recognition of the crew's effectiveness during the cleanup operation, Fort McHenry was awarded the Meritorious Unit Commendation and the Coast Guard Special Operations Service Ribbon.

On 20 June 1990, Fort McHenry began her second deployment and spent 10 months in the Persian Gulf for Desert Shield/Desert Storm. When she returned to her homeport of San Diego on 17 April 1991, Fort McHenry received the Navy Unit Commendation, National Defense Service Medal, Southwest Asia Service Medal, Kuwait Liberation Medal (Saudi Arabia), Kuwait Liberation Medal (Kuwait) and the Combat Action Ribbon. Eight months later, Fort McHenry deployed to the Western Pacific on 6 January 1992. After several successful multinational exercises and port visits, Fort McHenry returned to San Diego on 6 July 1992.

Following an extensive overhaul period, Fort McHenry began the training cycle to prepare for her next deployment. While in the training cycle, Fort McHenry transited to the East Coast through the Panama Canal to pick up five new LCACs from Panama City, Florida. At the completion of the training cycle, Fort McHenry embarked on her fourth deployment from 9 June to 9 December 1994. While deployed, Fort McHenry participated in Operation Restore Hope. The ship also participated in Operation Vigilant Warrior. Following the deployment, Fort McHenry was awarded her second Navy Unit Commendation and Armed Forces Expeditionary Medal and also received her fourth Battle Efficiency Award.

=== 1995 – 2000 ===
On 1 September 1995, Fort McHenry departed San Diego to become one of the units forward-deployed to Sasebo, Japan.

Following her arrival to Japan, Fort McHenry participated in training exercises and multi-national exercises such as exercise Tandem Thrust and Crocodile in Australia, Cobra Gold in Thailand, and Foal Eagle in South Korea. She visited ports during those exercises including Shanghai, China, and Kure, Japan.

During May 1998, Fort McHenry participated on Cooperation Afloat Readiness and Training (CARAT 98), which includes visits and exercises with countries in the Western Pacific such as Brunei, Singapore, Malaysia and Thailand. In addition to her involvement in CARAT 98, Fort McHenry received the Commander, Naval Surface Pacific Fleet Wellness Unit Award for 1997 and the Chief of Naval Operations Safety Award for 1997 on 1 June 1998.

After spending January 1999 in Hong Kong, Fort McHenry entered the competitive phase of her training cycle. In April 1999, Fort McHenry participated in exercise Tandem Thrust 99 in Guam. Fort McHenry was also named a repeat winner of the Commander, Naval Surface Pacific Fleet Wellness Unit Award. Finally, during June 1999, Fort McHenry underwent two Total Ship Training Assessments (TSTA), which confirmed the ship's training progress during the 1999 competitive cycle.

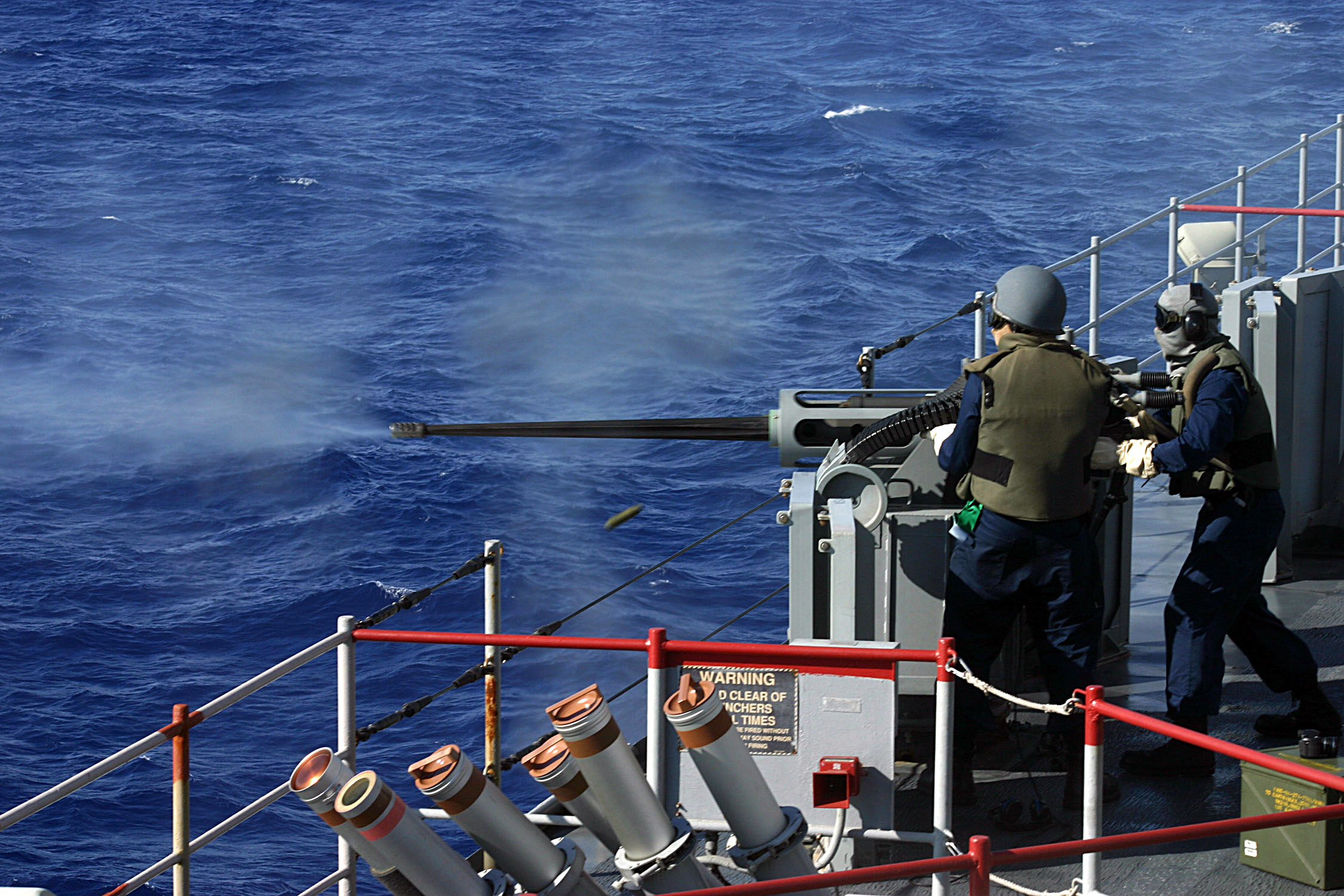
A live fire exercise featuring a 25 mm Mk 38 automatic cannon aboard Fort McHenry

In 2000, Fort McHenry participated in exercise Balikatan 2000 with the Philippine Armed Forces. The ship was named a repeat winner of the Battle Efficiency Award, Command Excellence Awards for Maritime Warfare, Engineering/Survivability, Command and Control, and Logistics Management for her achievements during the 1999 fiscal year. After Balikatan 2000 was completed, Fort McHenry continued her hectic schedule by participating in Exercise Cobra Gold 2000, during May 2000, with the navies of Thailand and Singapore. The busy schedule continued in October 2000, when Fort McHenry participated in Exercise Neptune Thunder 2000 with US Army forces stationed in South Korea. From 27 October to 3 November, Fort McHenry concluded the year, and the millennium, with her participation in Exercise Foal Eagle which took place in South Korea.

=== 2001 – 2006 ===
Fort McHenry spent the first half of 2001 in a lengthy Ship Required Availability period. During this period the ship acquired two new weapon systems, Rolling Airframe Missile (RAM) Launcher and Ship's Self Defense System (SSDS), both would greatly increased the ship's defensive capabilities.

After returning to sea in June 2001, Fort McHenry entered the middle of her training cycle. The ship completed a port visit to Kagoshima, Japan in August 2001, where approximately seven thousand residents of Kagoshima toured Fort McHenry.

In 2004, Fort McHenry forward deployed at FA Sasebo, Japan, and assigned to Amphibious Group 1. In May 2004, Fort McHenry departed for a three-month deployment along with several ships including USCGC Mellon, USS Salvor, USS Russell and USS McCampbell. The deployment was centered around an annual exercise called Cooperation Afloat Readiness and Training (CARAT) 2004. Following a two and a half-month SAR period, Fort McHenry was once again put into action as she was emergency deployed to the Philippines after several typhoons hit the country during November 2004. She provided a platform for U.S. Air Force helicopters to bring much-needed fuel into the Philippines.

In 2005 Fort McHenry participated in tsunami relief in the Asian tsunami crisis. She provided a platform for six CH-46 helicopters and LCACs to bring much-needed supplies into Banda Aceh, Indonesia. During Operation Unified Assistance, Fort McHenry was joined by many USN ships including USS Abraham Lincoln and USNS Mercy. Following this tasking, Fort McHenry immediately went to the island of Iwo Jima to join American & Japanese veterans for the 60th commemoration of the Battle of Iwo Jima. Fort McHenry deployed for the first half of Cooperation Afloat Readiness and Training (CARAT) 2005. This deployment was completed by USS Boxer and USS Harpers Ferry.

On 31 March 2006, USS Tortuga arrived in Sasebo to replace Fort McHenry. The crews of the two ships swapped hulls, after which, on 13 April Tortuga's old crew took Fort McHenry back to NAB Little Creek, Virginia, where she was to be homeported. As of January 2007 she was undergoing a major maintenance overhaul at Naval Station Norfolk.

=== 2007 ===
The United States Department of Defense stated on 15 October 2007 that Fort McHenry was slated to leave Little Creek, Virginia, 16 October 2007 for a seven-month deployment to the Gulf of Guinea that the chief of U.S. Africa Command said will exemplify how that new command will operate.

The amphibious dock landing ship served as a platform for the Africa Partnership Station Initiative, which aims to work cooperatively with U.S. and international partners in promoting maritime security in Western Africa.

The ship sailed to Spain to take on officers for the internal APS staff from several European partners; Spain, the United Kingdom, Portugal and Germany, among them, before heading to the Gulf of Guinea.

Her full complement included representatives of U.S. and partner nations' government agencies and non-governmental organizations, all working together to help African nations increase their ability to provide maritime security. In addition to the U.S. military, U.S. agencies that participated were the State Department, Department of Homeland Security, U.S. Agency for International Development, National Oceanic and Atmospheric Administration, and U.S. Coast Guard.

High Speed Vessel Swift joined Fort McHenry in the Gulf of Guinea, where she transported students as well as trainers during visits to Senegal, Liberia, Ghana, Cameroon, Gabon, Sao Tome and Principe.

=== 2009 ===
On 13 May 2009 Fort McHenry left her homeport at Little Creek Naval Amphibious Base for a regularly scheduled deployment as part of the Bataan Amphibious Ready Group (BATARG) and 22nd Marine Expeditionary Unit (22 MEU), including more than 4,000 sailors and marines. The BATARG/22 MEU supported maritime security operations, provided crisis response capability and increased theater security cooperation and forward naval presence in the 5th and 6th Fleet areas of operation.

BATARG was composed of Fort McHenry, the multi-purpose amphibious assault ship USS Bataan, and the amphibious transport dock USS Ponce. The 22 MEU included a battalion landing team from 3rd Battalion, 2nd Marine Regiment, an aviation combat team composed of elements from Marine Medium Tiltrotor Squadron 263; elements of Combat Logistics Battalion 22; and the MEU's command section.

=== 2010 ===
On 13 January 2010, Fort McHenry was sent to assist in the relief efforts following the 2010 Haiti earthquake.

=== 2012 ===
The ship was scheduled to dock in Dublin port, Ireland on 31 August for the American football game "The Emerald Classic" between Notre Dame University's "Fighting Irish" and the US Naval Academy. On board was a crew of 350 sailors and 180 marines.

=== 2015 ===
In January 2015, Fort McHenry and USS Iwo Jima were positioned off the coast of Yemen on standby to evacuate the staff of the U.S. embassy should the need arise due to the collapse of the Yemeni government.

=== 2016 ===
In mid-February, Fort McHenry participated in amphibious exercise, Cold Response, together with the Dutch amphibious transport docks HNLMS Johan de Witt and HNLMS Rotterdam.

=== 2018 ===
On 22 December, Fort McHenry personnel, joined with elements of the 22nd Marine Expeditionary Unit experienced an outbreak of parotitis. A ship-wide quarantine was initiated and affected personnel were segregated. The outbreak was not reported until 9 March 2019.

=== 2019 ===
In January 2019, the ship transited from the Mediterranean Sea through the Dardanelles Strait and entered the Black Sea, later visiting the Romanian port of Constanța, a major base for the Romanian Navy. The ship was part of the USS Kearsarge Amphibious Ready Group (ARG), and was carrying the 22nd Marine Expeditionary Unit from Camp Lejeune, North Carolina. In March 2019, she was quarantined for over three months following an outbreak of mumps. While quarantined, she continued to operate in 5th Fleet conducting a wide range of operations. She was given short notice tasking to depart 5th Fleet and chop to 6th Fleet in support of BALTOPS 2019, a large scale Naval exercise bringing NATO and partner allies together.

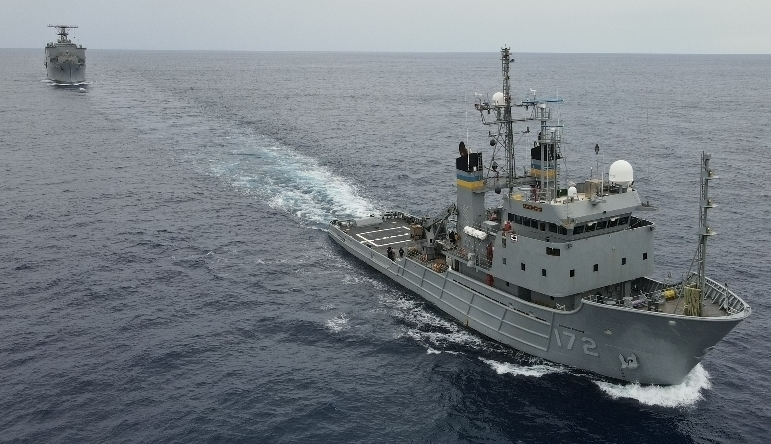
USNS Apache (T-ATF-172) (foreground) tows Fort McHenry to the Naval Inactive Ship Maintenance Facility in April 2021

=== 2021 ===
Fort McHenry was decommissioned on 27 March 2021 and as of April 2021 is undergoing transfer to the Naval Inactive Ship Maintenance Facility in Philadelphia, Pennsylvania, where she was placed in reserve status.

=== Fate ===
On 13 January 2026, ex-Fort McHenry was towed for scrap.
