= Rocket attacks on Eilat and Aqaba =

Rocket attacks on the neighboring cities of Eilat, in Israel, and Aqaba, in Jordan, have been a tactic used by militants from the Palestinian group Hamas and organizations linked with Al-Qaeda because of the relative ease of launching rocket attacks against these two cities from adjacent desert areas. Most of these attacks target Eilat, the last attack on Aqaba was in 2010.

== Attacks ==
=== February 20, 2017 ===
Two rockets fired by militants from northern Sinai landed in southern Israel. The attack came a day after an ISIS affiliate claimed that several of its members had been killed by an Israeli drone. No damage or injuries were reported.

=== February 8, 2017 ===
February 8 2017 rocket attack on southern Israel
- Location: Eilat, Israel
- Date: February 8, 2017
- Weapon: Grad rockets
- Deaths: 0
- Injuries: 0
- Perpetrator: Islamic State of Iraq and the Levant

A number of rockets were shot at Eilat from the Sinai, three of which were intercepted by the Iron Dome. There were no reported casualties. The Islamic State in Sinai claimed responsibility for the attack.

=== July 24, 2014 ===
Multiple rockets reported fired at Eilat. One rocket was shot down by the Iron Dome, and one lands in an open area within the city. No injuries reported, although several were treated for shock.

=== July 15, 2014 ===
Three rockets are fired at Eilat. One hits a parked car near Eilat's airport, and four injuries were reported.

=== January 31, 2014 ===
January 31 2014 rocket attack on southern Israel
- Location: Eilat, Israel
- Date: January 31, 2014; 21:46
- Weapon: Grad rockets
- Deaths: 0
- Injuries: 0
- Perpetrator: Ansar Bayt al-Maqdis

Multiple Grad rockets launched from Sinai targeting Eilat are reported. One rocket was intercepted by the Iron Dome system. Alarm sounded and no injuries or fatalities were recorded. The Salafist organization Ansar Bayt al-Maqdis took responsibility.

=== January 20, 2014 ===
January 20 2014 rocket attack on southern Israel
- Location: Eilat, Israel
- Date: January 20, 2014; 19:00
- Weapon: Grads rockets
- Deaths: 0
- Injuries: 0
- Perpetrator: Ansar Bayt al-Maqdis

Two Grad rockets were fired at Eilat from Sinai, falling short of the city and exploding in open areas. No injuries were reported.

=== August 12, 2013 ===
August 2013 rocket attack on southern Israel
- Location: Eilat, Israel
- Date: August 12, 2013
- Weapon: One rocket
- Deaths: 0
- Injuries: 3
- Perpetrator: Ansar Bayt al-Maqdis

The terror group Ansar Bayt al-Maqdis, an al-Qaeda-linked Salafist group operating in Egypt's Sinai Peninsula, fired a rocket at Eilat. The projectile was intercepted by Iron Dome, which had recently been deployed in the area. Three residents were treated for acute stress reaction. No physical injuries or damage were reported.

=== July 4, 2013 ===
July 2013 rocket attack on southern Israel
- Location: Eilat, Israel
- Date: July 4, 2013
- Weapon: One rocket
- Deaths: 0
- Injuries: 0

A rocket was apparently fired from Egypt at Eilat. Israelis reported hearing several explosions in the area, and the remains of a rocket were found five days later.

=== April 17, 2013 ===
April 2013 rocket attack on southern Israel
- Location: Aqaba, Jordan, and Eilat, Israel
- Date: April 17, 2013
- Weapon: Five Grad class missiles
- Deaths: 0
- Injuries: 0
- Perpetrator: Mujahideen Shura Council claimed responsibility

Around 9 am, three rockets were fired at the southern Israeli resort city of Eilat, on the Red Sea coast. The rockets were believed to have been fired by Islamist terrorists from Egypt's adjacent Sinai Peninsula. One of the rockets exploded in the yard of a home. No physical injuries or damage were reported, but a number of residents suffered from acute stress reaction. The attack forced the complete closure of Eilat Airport. Two rockets also landed in Jordan's neighboring resort city of Aqaba.

=== August 15, 2012 ===
August 2012 rocket attack on southern Israel
- Location: Negev, Israel
- Date: August 15, 2012
- Weapon: Two Grad class missiles
- Deaths: 0
- Injuries: 0

Two powerful blasts rocked the Eilat area. No injuries or damages were reported. Two days later Israeli Police found the remains of a Grad rocket.

=== June 16, 2012 ===
June 2012 rocket attack on southern Israel
- Location: Negev, Israel
- Date: June 16, 2012
- Weapon: Two Grad class missiles
- Deaths: 0
- Injuries: 0

Two rockets shells were found in southern Israel, following reports overnight that an explosion had been heard in the area. No injuries or damages were reported in the incident. The IDF determined that the projectiles appeared to be 122-millimeter (4.8 in) Grad-type rockets. It was discovered that Hamas asked Egyptian Bedouins to fire the rockets at request of Muslim Brotherhood.

=== April 4, 2012 ===
April 2012 rocket attack on Eilat
- Location: Eilat, Israel
- Date: April 4, 2012
- Weapon: at least two Grad class missiles
- Deaths: 0
- Injuries: 0

After nightfall, terrorists in the Sinai fired three Grad missiles at Eilat. Residents heard large explosions, and, the following day, police sappers found remnants of the missile on a residential construction site. A second rocket was found outside the city a few days later. No physical injuries or damage were reported, but some residents suffered from shock. no terrorist group had claimed responsibility. In the aftermath, Israel published a statement that any rocket attacks from Sinai peninsula will be counted as Hamas responsibility. Also, Israel allowed the Egyptian military forces to enter the Sinai

=== August 2, 2010 ===
August 2010 rocket attack on Eilat/Aqaba
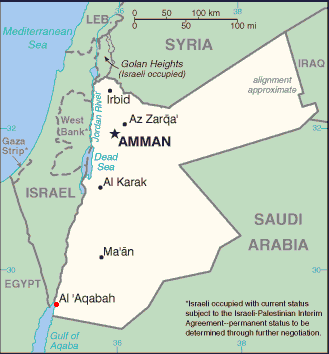
- Al 'Aqabah (Aqaba) shown within Jordan. Eilat lies nearby at the southern tip of Israel, and the Gulf of Aqaba as well as the Egyptian Sinai Peninsula are also shown.
- Location: Aqaba, Jordan, and Eilat, Israel
- Date: August 2, 2010
- Weapon: Seven Grad-type Katyusha rockets
- Deaths: 1
- Injuries: 4
- Perpetrators: Hamas/Palestinian militants (alleged), Al-Tawhid wa al-Jihad (alleged)

The attack took place in the early morning. The projectiles were Iranian-made 122 mm Grad rockets, each weighing 6 kilograms (13 lb) and with ranges of approximately 20 kilometers (12 mi).

Two rockets fell in front of the InterContinental hotel in Aqaba. Five Jordanian men traveling in a taxi nearby were wounded, one seriously. The driver, Subhi Yousef Alawneh, died from his injuries later the same day. The road was damaged and two vehicles were destroyed, though the hotel itself escaped harm.

Three rockets fell on the city of Eilat, one in a drainage pool in the northern part of the city, causing no reported injuries or damage.

One rocket fell near an Egyptian security installation near Taba, and another fell into the Red Sea.

Source and perpetrators

On 4 August, Israeli Prime Minister Benjamin Netanyahu announced that his country had intelligence confirming that Hamas, a Palestinian Islamist militant group and de facto governing authority in the Gaza Strip, was responsible for the attack. He said the group was also responsible for a similar attack in April of that year (see below). It is believed that the rockets were cached in the Sinai and that the perpetrators were affiliated with Hamas and came from Gaza.

Egypt initially denied that the rockets had been launched from Egyptian territory, but reversed its position following investigations, stating that the rockets were fired simultaneously from the Taba region. Egyptian security sources implied that the rockets were launched by Hamas, stating that Hamas militants had snuck into Sinai through the Rafah tunnels to hide the fact that the group was behind the operation. Egyptian establishment media charged that Hamas was working "on the orders of their Iranian masters", and strongly attacked both Hamas and Iran for harming Egypt, claiming that Egypt would take revenge on the Palestinian group.

Palestinian Authority security officials said that the commander of Hamas' military wing in Rafah, Raed al Atar, was responsible for ordering the attack. Intelligence sources said that a number of militants under his control crossed into Sinai through the Rafah tunnels, where they were met by Egyptian drivers and the rockets. They then proceeded in off-road vehicles to Taba, avoiding security checks by the Egyptians.

Hamas and Islamic Jihad denied any link with the attacks. An anonymous Jordanian political source assessed that the attack was perpetrated by Tawhid al-Jihad, a radical Muslim group which opposes Hamas and collaborates with Sinai Bedouin who are at odds with the Egyptian authorities.

The September 2010 arrest in Egypt of Mohammed Dababish, the Hamas intelligence chief in Gaza, is thought to be linked to the August 2010 attacks.

Responses

The Jordanian government condemned the rocket firings as a "terror attack."

Israeli President Shimon Peres said the attack appeared to be aimed at disrupting the possible resumption of direct peace talks between the Israeli and Palestinian leaderships for the first time in over 18 months. "There is a real struggle in the Middle East between the peace camp of moderate countries and the camp of extremists, who want to sabotage any chance of peace," Peres said. Israeli Prime Minister Benjamin Netanyahu made similar comments, telling Jordan's King Abdullah and Egyptian President Hosni Mubarak that the attack telling "was committed by terror agents who want to thwart the peace process". "All states in the region that aspire towards peace should fight these powers, push terror away and bring peace closer," he added.

In mid-September 2010, the United States State Department issued a travel advisory warning to American citizens advising them not to travel to Aqaba based on concrete information about planned terrorist rocket attacks similar to the previous incidents. The department lifted that warning on Sept. 27.

Political ramifications

In the wake of the attack, the Israeli Ministry of Tourism accused the United States State Department of issuing a biased travel advisory, "singling out Eilat but not Aqaba, despite the fact that the rockets' only fatality was in the Jordanian city." Israeli Tourism Minister Stas Misezhnikov announced plans to take the issue up with U.S. ambassador James Cunningham, asserting that "Differentiating Israel from its neighbor that actually suffered loss of life is improper and lacks balance."

Egyptian response

The August 2, 2010 rocket attack on Eilat and Aqaba sparked rage in Egypt at Hamas and Iran. The Egyptian press stated that the firing of the rockets from Egyptian territory by Hamas or by organizations cooperating with it constituted the crossing of a red line. The Egyptian position is that Iran is employing local proxies, such as Hamas, to escalate violence in the Middle East and to sabotage the Palestinian reconciliation efforts, as well as efforts to renew Palestinian-Israeli peace negotiations.

=== April 22, 2010 ===
Before dawn, three 122mm Grad rockets were fired from the Sinai Peninsula in Egypt at the resort town of Eilat at the extreme south of Israel. One rocket exploded in the neighboring town of Aqaba in Jordan, destroying an empty refrigerator warehouse. The other two rockets fell into the Red Sea. No injuries were reported. No group claimed responsibility, but it was later determined that Hamas was behind the attack.

=== 2005 ===
In 2005 several Katyusha rockets were fired from within Jordan. Some hit near the Eilat airport and two hit very close to two United States Navy ships docked in Aqaba, USS Kearsarge, a Wasp-class amphibious assault ship, and USS Ashland, a Whidbey Island-class dock landing ship. The self-styled Abdullah Azzam Brigades claimed responsibility. One of the rockets hit a Jordanian military hospital, killing a Jordanian soldier. The attack is regarded as having been perpetrated by the al-Zarqawi branch of Al Qaeda. > This was the most serious attack on American targets in Jordan since the 2002 killing of American diplomat Laurence Foley in Amman.

== Intelligence activity ==
- American intelligence warned of a fresh wave of planned rocket attacks on Aqaba in 2010.
- Egyptian security forces, which blame Hamas for the deadly 2010 rocket attacks on Eilat and Aqaba, went on high alert after receiving reports of new plans to smuggle rockets from Gaza into Egypt for the purpose of launching them at Israel.

== Targets ==
Goals thought to be targets for terrorist rocket attacks in Aqaba and Eilat, in addition to the civilian population, include United States naval vessels on port calls, and civilian cruise ships.

== Desert as launching base for terrorist rocket attacks ==
Hamas is in communication with members of Sinai Bedouin groups and is thought to be capable of supplying them with rockets. Egypt's imperfect control over Sinai Bedouin makes Bedouin-supported use of the Sinai as a base for launching rocket attacks possible. According to The Economist, Hamas has already sent "a group from Gaza" to launch rocket attacks form Sinai at Eilat. According to Ronen Bergman, security affairs commentator for Yedioth Ahronoth: "The farther from Cairo, the weaker the central authority is. They are having great difficulties with the Bedouin. If Hamas is able to deepen its cooperation with the Bedouin, and create bases in Sinai for recruitment, we're talking about a new ballgame."

According to The Christian Science Monitor, concern about the possible use by terrorist organizations of the Sinai desert with the aid and cooperation of Sinai Bedouin has been growing in 2010. Although in the past concern has focused on the use of the Sinai by international Islamist organizations believed to operate there in cooperation with Sinai Bedouin, but the rise of Hamas in Gaza has increased concern about an expansion of Hamas terrorist infrastructure into Sinai. In April 2010, 26 members of an alleged Hezbollah spy cell were convicted by an Egyptian court on charges including planning attacks on tourist sites and smuggling weapons form Sinai Hamas in Gaza. Earlier terrorist attacks on Egyptian beach resorts in Sinai including Sharm el-Sheikh and southern Taba are thought to have been the work of international terrorist organizations, including Al Qaeda, in cooperation with Sinai Bedouin.

Israeli General Gabi Ashkenazi has said that Israel is aware of Hamas activity in the Sinai and that "Hamas will be held accountable" if it launches rockets at Eilat.
