= USS Ashland (LSD-48) =

US Navy ship

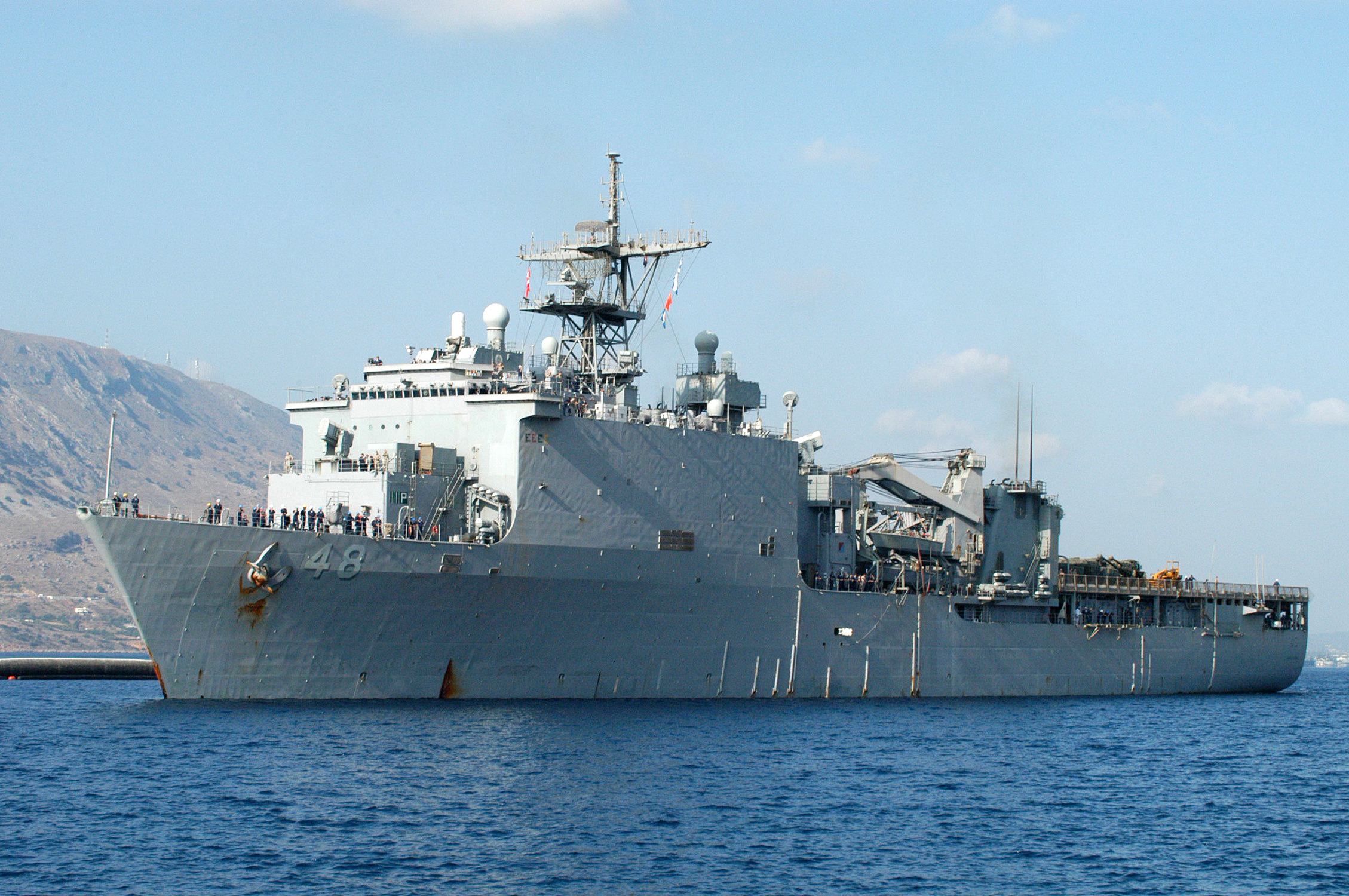
- USS Ashland (LSD-48)

History

United States
- Name: Ashland
- Namesake: Ashland
- Ordered: 11 December 1985
- Laid down: 4 April 1988
- Launched: 11 November 1989
- Commissioned: 9 May 1992
- Home port: San Diego, California
- Motto: Deliver Liberty, Defend Freedom
- Status: in active service
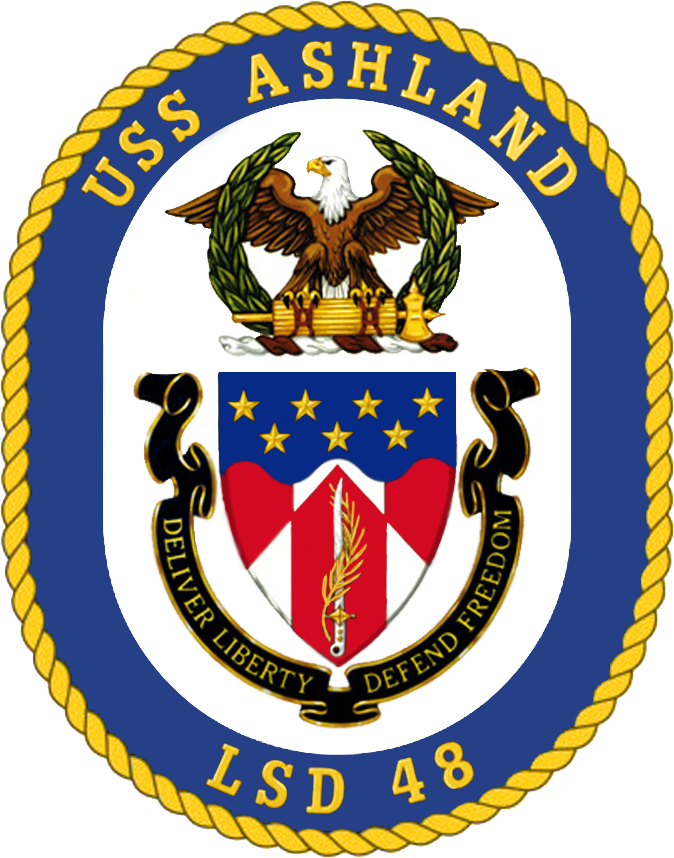
- Badge

General characteristics
- Class & type: Whidbey Island-class dock landing ship
- Displacement: 11,149 tons (light); 16,883 tons (full)
- Length: 610 ft (190 m)
- Beam: 84 ft (26 m)
- Draft: 21 ft (6.4 m)
- Propulsion: 4 Colt Industries, 16-cylinder diesel engines, 2 shafts, 33,000 shp (25,000 kW)
- Speed: over 20 knots (37 km/h; 23 mph)
- Boats & landing craft carried: 4 LCACs or 21 LCM-6 or up to 36 Amphibious Assault Vehicles
- Capacity: on deck: one LCM-6, two LCPL and one LCVP
- Troops: Marine detachment: 402 + 102 surge
- Complement: 22 officers, 391 enlisted
- Armament: 2 × 25 mm Mk 38 cannons; 2 × 20 mm Phalanx CIWS mounts; 2 × Rolling Airframe Missile; 6 × .50 caliber M2HB machine guns

USS Ashland (LSD-48) is a Whidbey Island-class dock landing ship of the United States Navy. She was the second Navy ship to be named for Ashland, the home of Henry Clay, in Lexington, Kentucky.

Ashland was laid down on 4 April 1988, by the Avondale Shipyards, New Orleans, Louisiana; launched and christened on 11 November 1989, sponsored by Mrs. Kathleen Foley, wife of Admiral Sylvester R. Foley, Jr. (Ret.); and commissioned on 9 May 1992, at New Orleans. As of April 2023, Ashland is homeported at Naval Base San Diego, and assigned to Expeditionary Strike Group 3.

== History ==
=== 2005 rocket attack ===
On 19 August 2005, the Ashland and USS Kearsarge were targeted by three Katyusha rockets while in port in Aqaba, Jordan. The vessels were not hit, but one Jordanian soldier was killed and another was wounded after two rockets hit nearby docks. The third rocket landed on a taxi near the Eilat airport in Israel but did not explode. Responsibility was claimed by the Abdullah Azzam Shaheed Brigade, which states that it is associated with the al-Qaeda terrorist group. The sailors aboard both warships were awarded the Combat Action Ribbon as a result of the attack.

=== Later service ===
In January 2007, the warship was sent to the coast of Somalia to conduct antiterrorist operations as part of the USS Dwight D. Eisenhower task force. On 31 May 2008 The Guardian reported that the human rights group Reprieve said up to seventeen US Naval vessels may have been used to covertly hold captives. Reprieve expressed the concern the Ashland had been used as a receiving ship for up to 100 captives taken in East Africa.

In April 2008, Ashland visited Antsiranana, Madagascar.

On 10 April 2010, seven suspected pirates on a skiff shot at the Ashland approximately 330 nautical miles (610 km) off the coast of Djibouti. Ashland fired two rounds at the skiff from her MK-38 Mod 2, 25mm gun. The people on board the skiff abandoned ship as it became engulfed in flames. Rigid-hulled inflatable boats from the Ashland rescued the six surviving individuals and brought them aboard the ship for medical treatment. The Ashland was not damaged and there were no injuries to the crew. On 29 November 2010 Jama Idle Ibrahim was sentenced at a federal courthouse in Norfolk, Virginia to 30 years in prison for his involvement in the April piracy attacks against the Ashland. "Today marks the first sentencing in Norfolk for acts of piracy in more than 150 years," said U.S. Attorney Neil H. MacBride. On 26 April 2017 the US Justice Department released a statement saying that Mohamed Farah, 31, of Somalia was sentenced to life in prison for his role in the attack.

Mid-life extension work on the Ashland, completed in 2012, included normal repair and refurbishment, as well as major alterations to several ship systems. Improvements to the ship's diesel engines, onboard networks, engineering control systems, and power management, and improved capacity for air conditioning and chilled water distribution were made. The biggest long-term change, however, involved the replacement of high-maintenance steam systems with all-electric functionality.

In November 2013, Ashland and USS Germantown supported relief operations in the wake of Typhoon Haiyan.

In August 2015, Ashland with portions of the 31st Marine Expeditionary Unit embarked conducted Defense Support to Civil Authorities (DSCA) in Saipan after Typhoon Soudelor passed through the Commonwealth of Northern Marianas Islands.

On 25 October 2017, Ashland rescued two American women who were drifting at sea.

On 14 March 2018, CNN did a 360° look using VR to share what it feels like to live on the Ashland. The 3:09-minute segment showed both sailors and marines going about their daily routines. In 2018, the Ashland received the Marjorie Sterrett Battleship Fund Award for the Pacific Fleet. This award is presented annually to the ship with the highest score in the Battle Effectiveness Award, the Battle "E."

The Ashland, one of eight active ships in its class, is expected to remain in service and mission-capable to 2038.

In December 2020 the U.S. Navy's Report to Congress on the Annual Long-Range Plan for Construction of Naval Vessels stated that the ship was planned to be placed Out of Commission in Reserve in 2023.

In May 2022, Ashland was a part of the USS America Amphibious Ready Group in Sasebo.

The 2022 National Defense Authorization Act blocked Ashland's decommissioning and retirement along with three other LSD class dock landing ships.

In April 2023, Ashland completed a permanent change of station arriving at Naval Base San Diego.
