= USS America (LHA-6) =

America-class amphibious assault ship

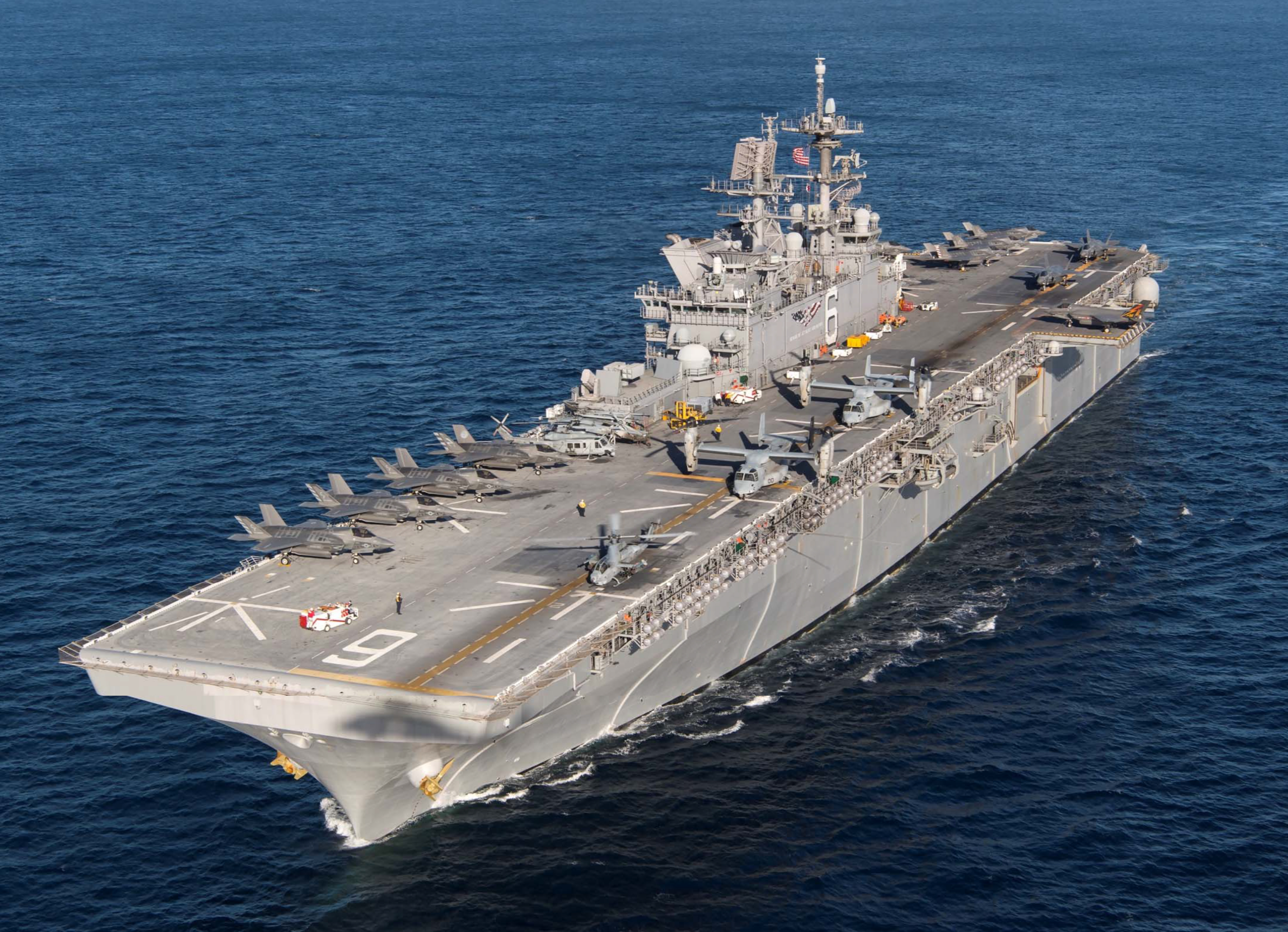
- USS America with F-35Bs, MV-22 Ospreys, and several helicopters on deck

History

United States
- Name: America
- Namesake: United States USS America (CV-66)
- Awarded: 1 June 2007
- Builder: Huntington Ingalls Industries
- Laid down: 17 July 2009
- Launched: 4 June 2012
- Sponsored by: Lynne Pace
- Christened: 20 October 2012
- Acquired: 10 April 2014
- Commissioned: 11 October 2014
- Home port: San Diego
- Identification: Hull number: LHA-6
- Motto: Bello vel pace paratus; (Ready for War or Peace)
- Status: in active service
- Notes: Program cost: $10.1 billion(FY15); Unit cost: $3.4 billion (FY15)
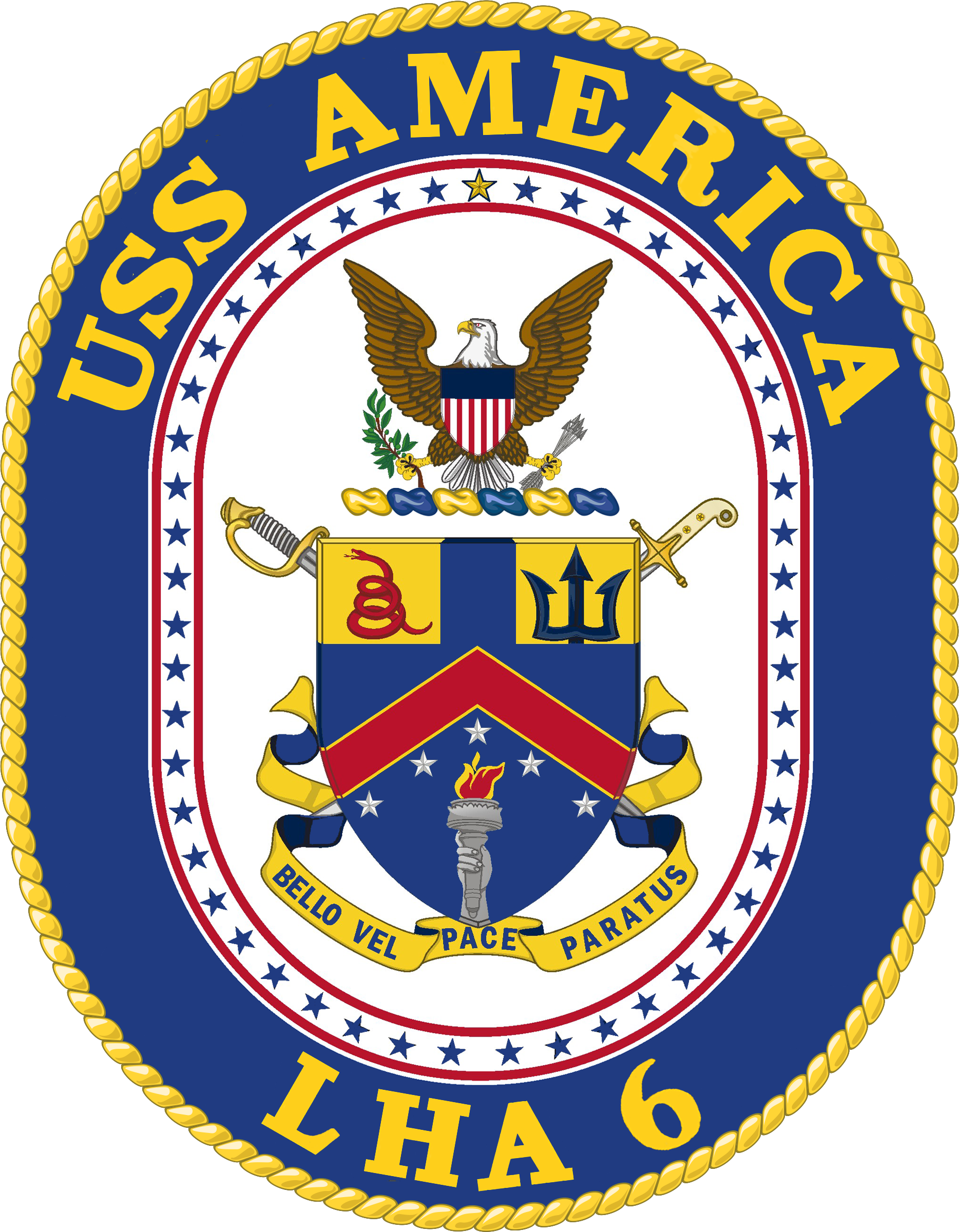
- Badge

General characteristics
- Class & type: America-class amphibious assault ship
- Type: Landing Helicopter Assault (LHA)
- Displacement: 44,971 long tons (45,693 t) full load
- Length: 844 ft (257 m)
- Beam: 106 ft (32 m)
- Draft: 26 ft (7.9 m)
- Propulsion: Two marine gas turbines, two shafts, 70,000 bhp (52,000 kW), two 5,000 hp (3,700 kW) auxiliary propulsion motors.
- Speed: Over 22 knots (41 km/h; 25 mph)
- Troops: 1,687 Marines (plus 184 surge)
- Complement: 102 officers, 1,102 enlisted
- Sensors & processing systems: AN/SPQ-9B surface search & fire control radar; AN/SPS-48E(V)10 3-D airsearch radar; AN/SPS-49(V)1 2-D airsearch radar; AN/SPN-43C air traffic control radar; Ship Self-Defense System (SSDS) Mod 4; Cooperative Engagement Capability (CEC)
- Electronic warfare & decoys: AN/SLQ-32B(V)2 Surface Electronic Warfare Improvement Program Block 1; 2 × Mk53 Nulka decoy launchers
- Armament: 2× Rolling Airframe Missile launchers; 2× Evolved Sea Sparrow Missile launchers; 2× 20 mm Phalanx CIWS mounts; 2x 25mm M242 Bushmaster Machine Gun System; 7× twin .50 BMG machine guns
- Aircraft carried: AV-8B Harrier II; MV-22B Osprey; F-35B Lightning II; CH-53K King Stallion; UH-1Y Venom; AH-1Z Viper; MH-60S Knighthawk

USS America (LHA-6) is an amphibious assault ship of the United States Navy and the lead ship of the America-class amphibious assault ship. The fourth U.S. warship to be named for the United States of America, she was delivered in spring of 2014, replacing Peleliu of the Tarawa class. Her mission is to act as the flagship of an expeditionary strike group or amphibious ready group, carrying part of a Marine expeditionary unit into battle and putting them ashore with helicopters and V-22 Osprey tilt-rotor aircraft, supported by F-35B Lightning II aircraft and helicopter gunships.

== Design ==
The design is based on that of USS Makin Island (LHD-8), itself an improved version of the Wasp-class amphibious assault ship. Approximately 45% of the Flight 0 design is based on Falkland Islands, with the well deck removed to allow more room for aircraft and aviation fuel. The removal of the well deck for landing craft allows for an extended hangar deck with two significantly wider high bay areas, each fitted with an overhead crane for aircraft maintenance.

These changes were required in order to operate the F-35B and MV-22, which are considerably larger than the aircraft they replace. The typical aircraft complement is expected to be 12 MV-22B transports, six STOVL F-35B multirole fighter aircraft, four CH-53K heavy transport helicopters, seven AH-1Z/UH-1Y attack/utility helicopters and two Navy MH-60S for air-sea rescue. The exact makeup of the ship's aircraft complement will vary according to the mission. America can carry 20 F-35B and 2 MH-60S to serve as a small aircraft carrier as demonstrated by LHD operations in Operation Iraqi Freedom.

Other enhancements include a re-configurable command and control complex, an on-board hospital, additional aviation fuel capacity and numerous aviation support spaces.

America will be modified in a similar way to the modifications made on USS Wasp to make her better able to withstand the great amounts of heat generated by the F-35B's engine exhaust when taking off or landing vertically. Intercostal structural members will be added underneath flight deck landing spots seven and nine to more closely perform timed cyclic flight operations without overstressing it. Other changes may involve re-adjusting some ship antennas to allow for a clear flight path. The ship will undergo a 40-week modification period where recently installed piping, lighting, and other features will be removed to weld reinforcements underneath the flight deck; the modification period would have been greater if its construction in the shipyard had been interrupted to perform it. Such accommodations will be included in all future America-class ships from the start.

The America class has an increased aviation capacity to include an enlarged hangar deck, realignment and expansion of the aviation maintenance facilities, a significant increase in available stowage for parts and support equipment and increased aviation fuel capacity. However, the ship's design represents a major departure from past designs and has been the source of considerable controversy, as it lacks the capabilities and multi-role flexibility of traditional amphibious ships, including the ability to launch landing craft and amphibious assault vehicles, such as the AAV-7. Some have even argued that America represents a "dead end" as an amphibious ship. In fact, the Navy is building only one other ship (Tripoli) to the LHA-6 blueprint. At issue is the focus on aviation capabilities, at the expense of the "well deck", which is the defining feature of the amphibious fleet and allows Marine Corps amphibious operations. The Marine Corps Commandant and the Chief of Naval Operations have signed an official Memorandum of Agreement that restores the well deck to USS Bougainville (LHA-8) and subsequent ships, while in 2015 the Commandant of the Marine Corps launched an initiative to ensure aviation platforms do not lead to an imbalance in the MAGTF.

== Construction and career ==
The U.S. Navy awarded Northrop Grumman Corporation's Ingalls Shipyard Division a $2.4 billion fixed-price incentive contract for the detailed design and construction of LHA-6, primarily at the company's shipyard in Pascagoula, Mississippi. The production decision was made in January 2006 and construction of LHA-6 began in December 2008. Navy Secretary Donald C. Winter announced in June 2008 that the ship would be named America. The keel-laying ceremony was held on 17 July 2009 with delivery originally planned for August 2012. The ship was launched on 4 June 2012, and christened on 20 October. She took to the sea for the first time on 5 November 2013, for five days of builder's sea trials in the Gulf of Mexico, and completed acceptance sea trials in February 2014.

This is the battle flag used by the USS America, resembling the Captain America's shield

America departed in commission without ceremony from Ingalls Shipbuilding in Pascagoula, Mississippi, on 11 July 2014 in transit to her homeport of San Diego, California. The ship earned commission status after the crew successfully completed the light-off assessment, anti-terrorism force protection certification and crew certification.

=== 2010s ===
America arrived at Rio de Janeiro on 5 August, and the local press was invited to a guided visit the next day. She arrived at her home port of San Diego, California on 15 September 2014. During transitions around South America, America's mission was to connect with regional allies, conducting joint exercises with Colombia, Brazil, Trinidad and Tobago, Uruguay, Chile, and Peru involving security and communications operations, as well as medical asset coordination and mission planning activities. The ship carried three SH-60 Seahawk helicopters of HSC-21 and four MV-22 Ospreys of VMX-22, which flew into countries and transported distinguished visitors to the ship. Plans are to embark the F-35B JSF for America's first operational deployment.

America was commissioned on 11 October 2014 in San Francisco as part of the activities of San Francisco Fleet Week 2014. The Secretary of the Navy (SECNAV) Ray Mabus was the featured speaker.

In July 2017, America was attached to the 15th MEU for Western Pacific 17-2 (WESTPAC 17–2). Their main mission was the supporting of Operation Inherent Resolve. During their deployment, marines and sailors aboard the America came to the aid of the USS John S. McCain at Changi Naval Base after the USS John S. McCain and Alnic MC collision. America provided messing and berthing services to McCain crew members and supported damage control efforts on board. America also supported the searches for the 10 missing Sailors all of which were eventually recovered. America decomposited stateside on 7 March 2018.

=== 2020s ===
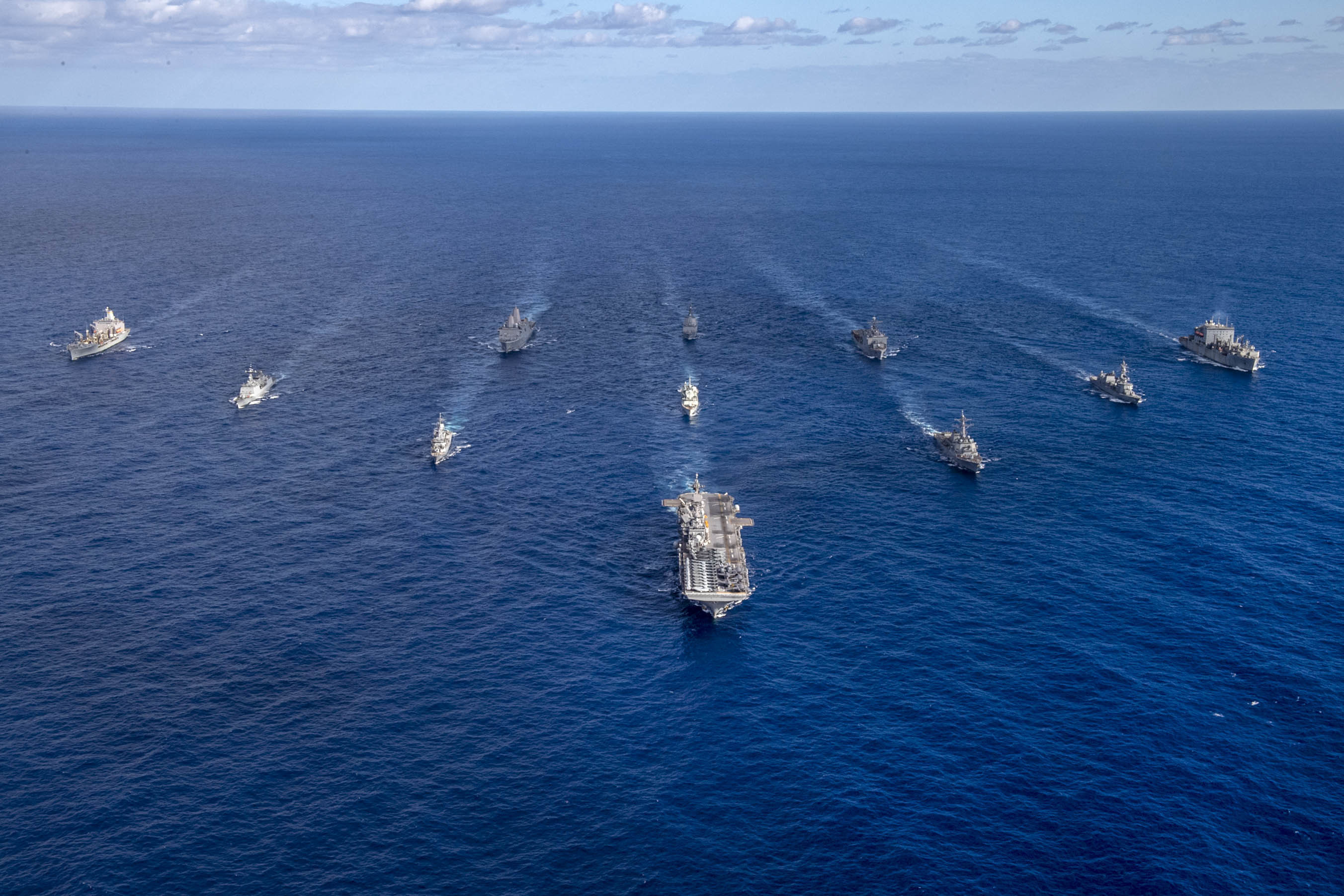
USS America steams with ships from left to right: USNS Rappahannock, ROKS Wang Geon, HMAS Parramatta, USS Rafael Peralta, JS Makinami, USNS Alan Shepard, HMCS Calgary, USS New Orleans, HMAS Brisbane and USS Germantown, 21 July 2021

In July 2021, America participated in Exercise Talisman Saber 2021 in north-east Australian waters, with more than 17,000 personnel from Australia and the United States and forces from Canada, Japan, New Zealand, South Korea and the United Kingdom.

In May 2022, America and her Amphibious Ready Group were in Sasebo, Japan.

In February 2025, it was announced that the USS Tripoli would be heading to Sasebo, Japan, and the America would be stationed back at Naval Base San Diego. In June 2025, USS America arrived at Sydney Harbour after 30 days at sea in anticipation of Exercise Talisman Sabre 2025.

== Awards ==
- Navy E Ribbon – (2017, 2018, 2019, 2021, 2022, 2023, 2024)
- Captain Edward F. Ney Memorial Award for outstanding food service – (2017, 2018, 2020)
- Admiral James H. Flatley Memorial Award for Naval Aviation Safety – (2020)
