= Whidbey Island-class dock landing ship =

United States Navy amphibious assault ship

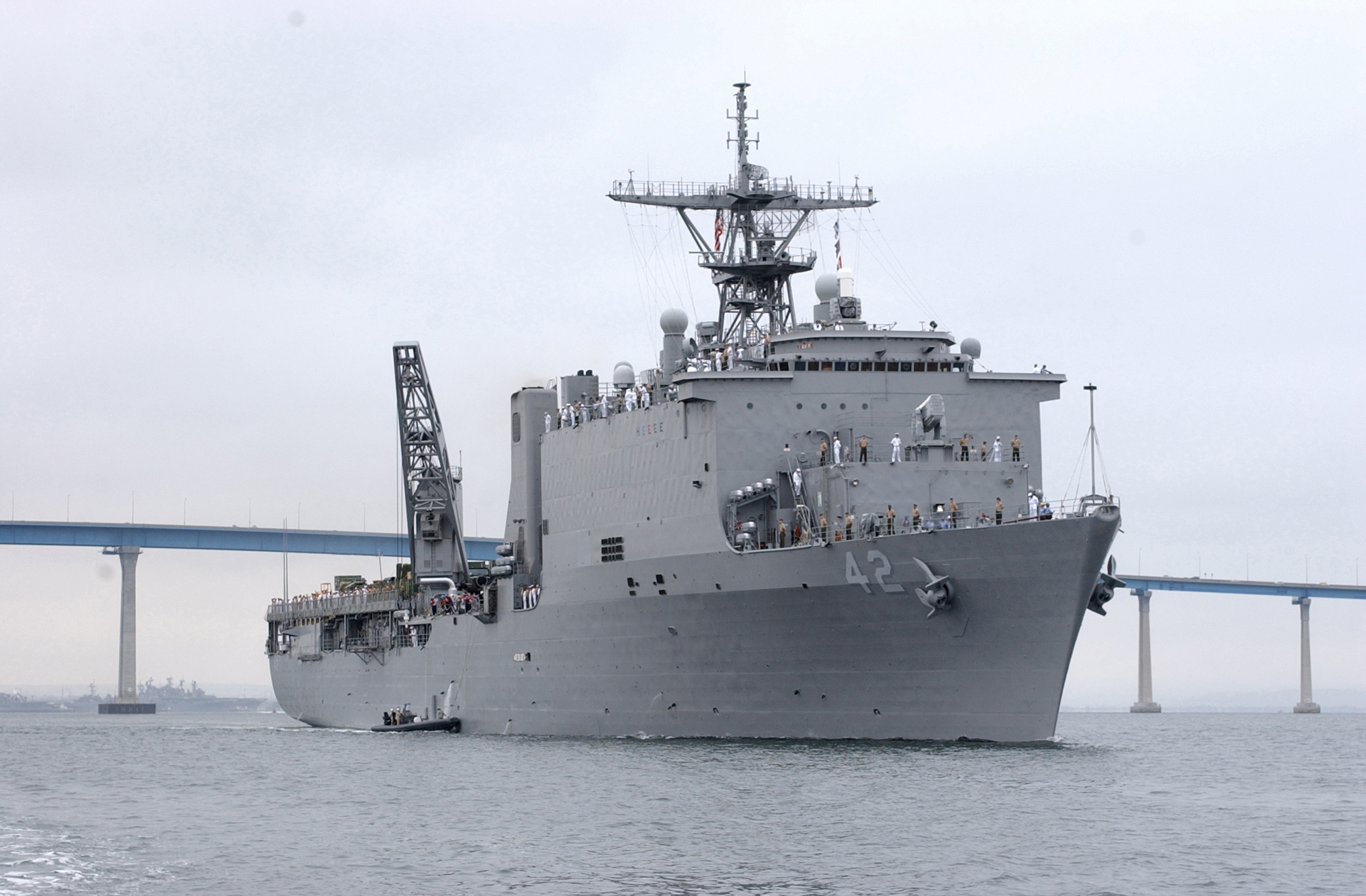
- USS Germantown (LSD-42) passing the Coronado Bridge in San Diego Bay in August 2003.

Class overview
- Name: Whidbey Island class
- Builders: Lockheed Shipbuilding and Construction Company
- Operators: United States Navy
- Preceded by: Anchorage class
- Succeeded by: Harpers Ferry class
- Cost: $250m
- In commission: 1985–present
- Planned: 8
- Completed: 8
- Active: 5
- Retired: 3

General characteristics
- Type: Dock landing ship
- Displacement: 16,100 tons
- Length: 609 ft (186 m)
- Beam: 84 ft (26 m)
- Draft: 19 ft 6 in (5.94 m)
- Propulsion: 4 Colt Industries, 16-cylinder diesel engines, 2 shafts, 33,000 shp (25,000 kW)
- Speed: over 20 kn (37 km/h; 23 mph)
- Boats & landing craft carried: 4+1 LCACs or 21 LCM-6s or up to 36 Amphibious Assault Vehicles AAV or 3 LCUs.
- Capacity: on deck: one LCM-6, two LCPL and one LCVP
- Complement: 30 officers, 300+ enlisted Embarked Marine complement: up to 504
- Armament: 2 × 25 mm Mk 38 cannons; 2 × 20 mm Phalanx CIWS mounts; 1 / 2 × Rolling Airframe Missile launchers; 6 × .50 caliber M2HB machine guns
- Aviation facilities: Large helicopter platform aft, no hangar

The Whidbey Island-class dock landing ship is a dock landing ship of the United States Navy. Introduced to fleet service in 1985, this class of ship features a large well deck for transporting United States Marine Corps (USMC) vehicles and a large flight deck for landing helicopters or V-22 Ospreys. The well deck was designed to hold four LCAC hovercraft, five if the vehicle ramp is raised, for landing Marines. Recent deployments have used a combination of LCU(s), AAVs, tanks, LARCs and other USMC vehicles. The Whidbey Island class of ship also uniquely benefits from multiple cranes and a shallow draft that further make it ideal for participating in amphibious operations.

As of 2009, all ships of the class are scheduled to undergo a midlife upgrade over the next five years to ensure that they remain in service through 2038. The ships will be upgraded annually through 2013, and the last ship will be modernized in 2014. Ships homeported on the East Coast will undergo upgrades at Metro Machine Corp., while those on the West Coast will receive upgrades at General Dynamics National Steel and Shipbuilding Company in San Diego.

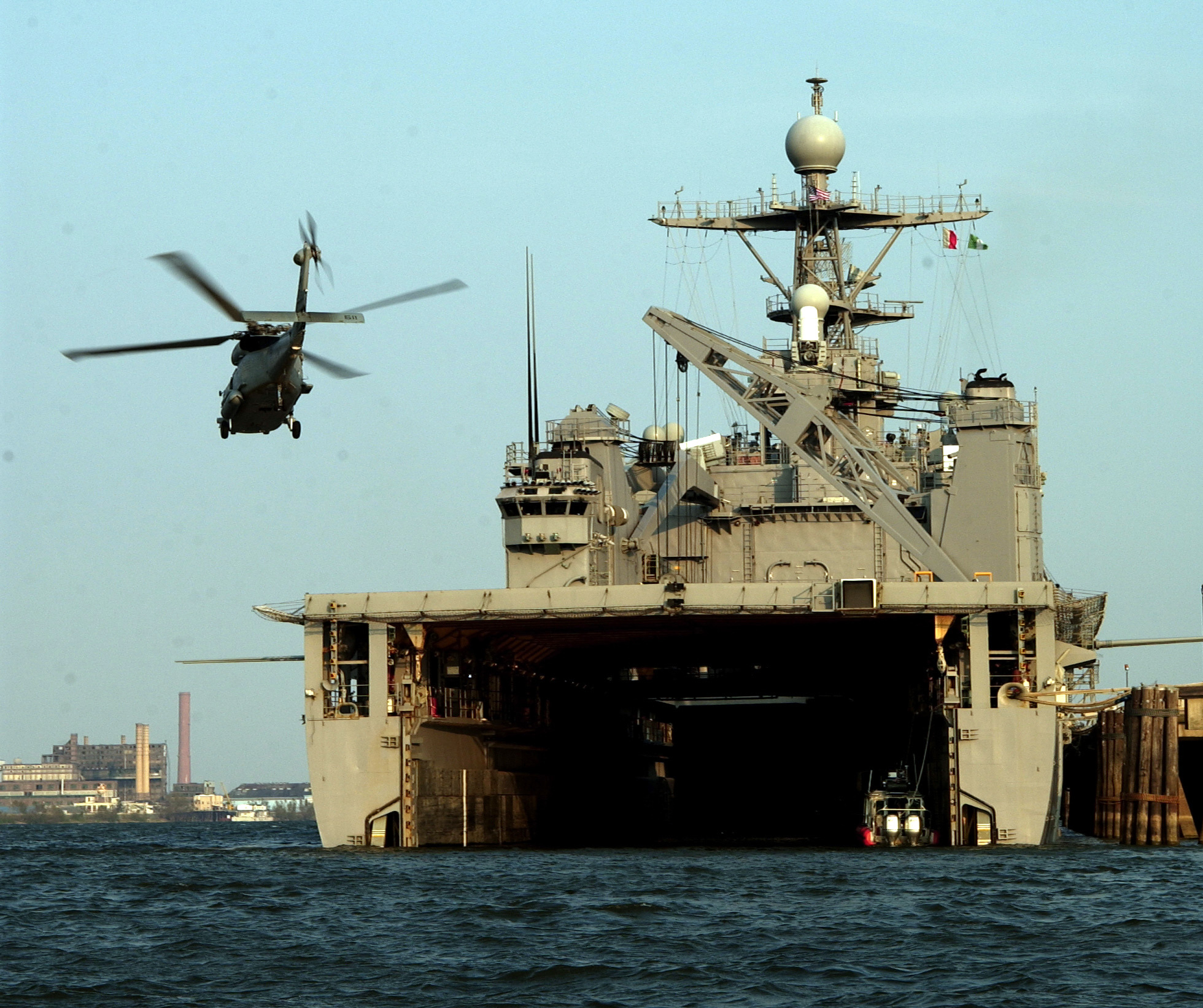
Stern view of USS Tortuga with open well deck

Major elements of the upgrade package include diesel engine improvements, fuel and maintenance savings systems, engineering control systems, increased air conditioning and chill water capacity, and replacement of air compressors. The ships also replaced steam systems with all-electric functionality that will decrease maintenance effort and expense.

== Ships ==
Ship Name	Hull No.	Builder	Laid Down	Launched	Commissioned	Decommissioned	Homeport	Fate	NVR
Whidbey Island	LSD-41	Lockheed, Seattle	4 August 1981	10 June 1983	9 February 1985	22 July 2022	n/a	Towed for scrap.	LSD-41
Germantown	LSD-42	Lockheed, Seattle	5 August 1982	29 June 1984	8 February 1986	24 September 2026	n/a		LSD-42
Fort McHenry	LSD-43	Lockheed, Seattle	10 June 1983	1 February 1986	8 August 1987	27 March 2021	n/a	Towed for scrap.	LSD-43
Gunston Hall	LSD-44	Avondale Shipyard	26 May 1986	27 June 1987	22 April 1989		Little Creek, Virginia		LSD-44
Comstock	LSD-45	Avondale Shipyard	27 October 1986	15 January 1988	3 February 1990		San Diego, California		LSD-45
Tortuga	LSD-46	Avondale Shipyard	23 March 1987	15 September 1988	17 November 1990		Little Creek, Virginia		LSD-46
Rushmore	LSD-47	Avondale Shipyard	9 November 1987	6 May 1989	1 June 1991		Sasebo, Japan		LSD-47
Ashland	LSD-48	Avondale Shipyard	4 April 1988	11 November 1989	9 May 1992		San Diego, California		LSD-48

Whidbey Island and Tortuga were scheduled to be decommissioned during the FYDP 2013-2018, and the remaining ships of the class were scheduled to be retired before the end of their service lives. However, the Navy reversed its plan to decommission Whidbey Island, and in 2015 Assistant Secretary of the Navy Sean Stackley informed Congress of the Navy's plans to modernize Whidbey Island, Tortuga, and Germantown to extend them each to a 44-year total service life.

== See also ==
Equivalent landing ships of the same era

- Ivan Rogov class
