= USS Germantown (LSD-42) =

Whidbey Island-class dock landing ship

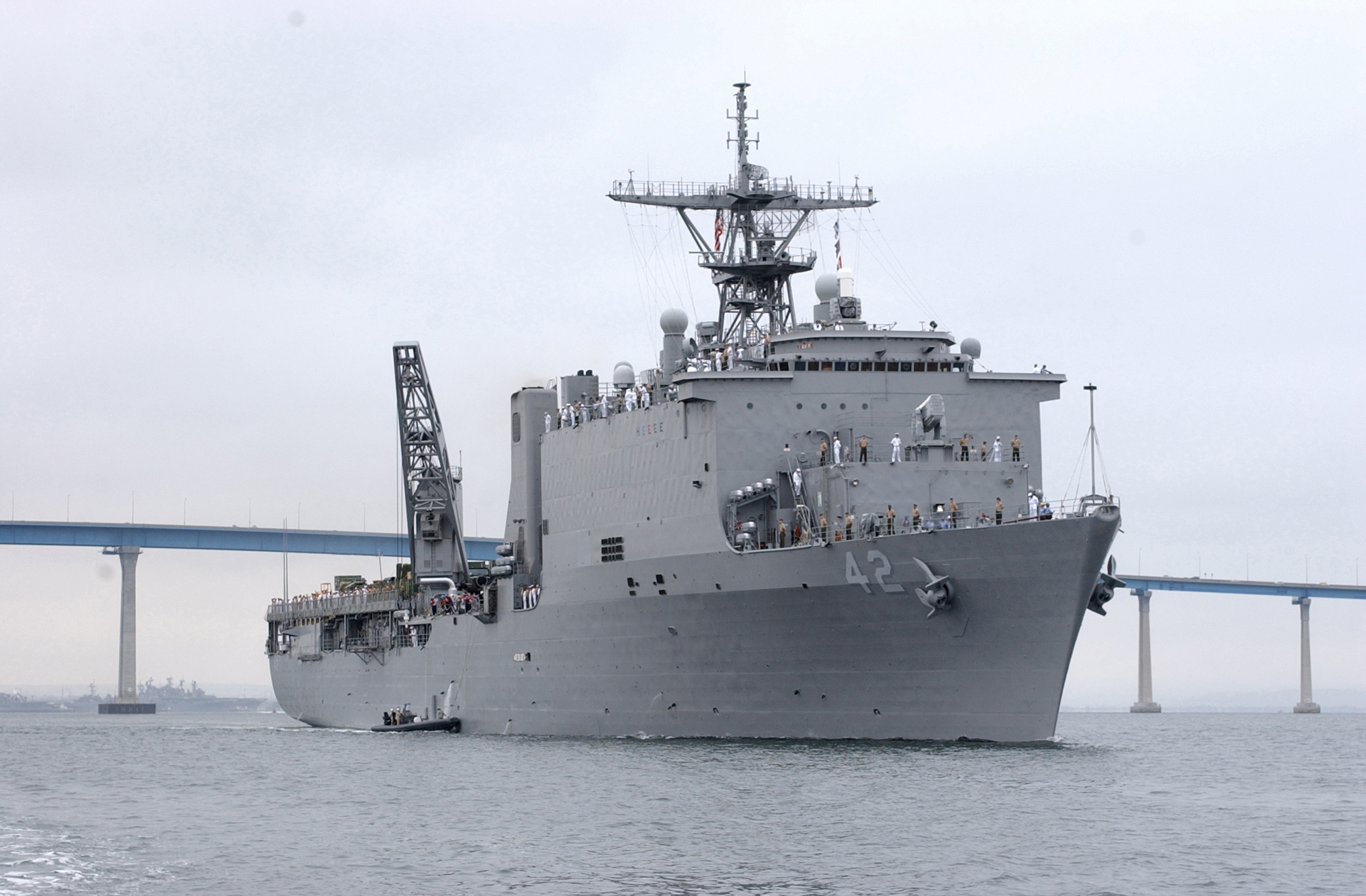
- USS Germantown (LSD-42)

History

United States
- Name: Germantown
- Namesake: Battle of Germantown
- Ordered: 26 March 1982
- Builder: Lockheed Shipbuilding
- Laid down: 5 August 1982
- Launched: 29 June 1984
- Commissioned: 8 February 1986
- Decommissioned: 24 September 2026
- Home port: San Diego, California
- Motto: Folgen Sie unseren Fusspuren! (Follow in Our Footsteps)
- Status: Decommissioned
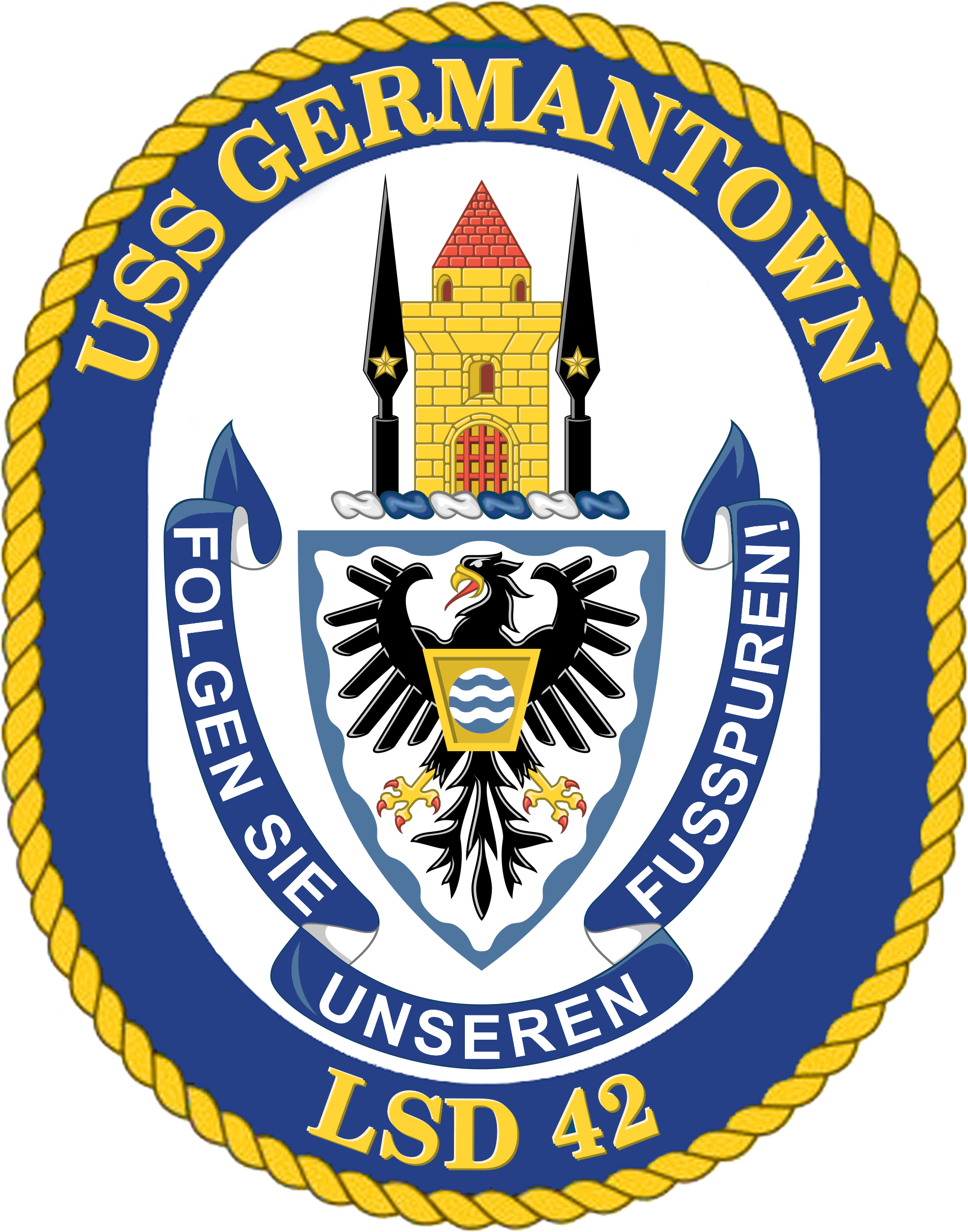
- Badge

General characteristics
- Class & type: Whidbey Island-class dock landing ship
- Displacement: 11,496 tons (light); 16,396 tons (full)
- Length: 610 ft (190 m)
- Beam: 84 ft (26 m)
- Draft: 21 ft (6.4 m)
- Propulsion: 4 Colt Industries, 16-cylinder diesel engines, 2 shafts, 33,000 shp (25,000 kW)
- Speed: over 20 knots (37 km/h; 23 mph)
- Boats & landing craft carried: 5 LCACs
- Troops: Marine detachment: 402 + 102 surge
- Complement: 22 officers, 391 enlisted
- Armament: 2 × 25 mm Mk 38 cannons; 2 × 20 mm Phalanx CIWS mounts; 2 × Rolling Airframe Missile; 6 × 0.5 in (12.7 mm) M2HB machine guns

USS Germantown (LSD-42) is the second Whidbey Island-class dock landing ship in the United States Navy. She is the second navy ship named after the Revolutionary War Battle of Germantown.

Germantown was the first ship in the class to serve in the Pacific. The amphibious ship's mission is to project power ashore by transporting and launching amphibious craft and vehicles loaded with embarked Marines in support of an amphibious assault. The ship was designed specifically to operate with Landing Craft Air Cushion (LCAC) vessels. She has the largest capacity for these landing craft (four to five) of any US Navy amphibious platform.

== Construction and career ==
The navy ordered USS Germantown on 26 March 1982. Four years later, on 8 February 1986, the ship was commissioned. In 1990–1991, she played a significant role during Operations Desert Shield and Desert Storm. The ship participated in mock amphibious assaults in Oman after the start of the air war in preparation for a possible amphibious assault.

On 16 August 2002, Harpers Ferry relieved Germantown as a forward-deployed naval unit at Sasebo, Japan. Germantown returned to San Diego, California, where she underwent a US$ 25 million overhaul. One year later, the ship deployed to the Persian Gulf as part of Expeditionary Strike Group One. Germantown supported Operation Iraqi Freedom by landing Marines and equipment from the 13th Marine Expeditionary Unit.

In September 2003, Germantown deployed with the first ever Expeditionary Strike Group to support Operation Iraqi Freedom, providing support for Marines in Iraq and Kuwait while also patrolling the Persian Gulf.

In February 2006, Germantown deployed to the Persian Gulf in support of Operation Enduring Freedom, carrying the 11th Marine Expeditionary Unit to Kuwait. She assisted Iraq in the North Persian Gulf by responding to an oil fire on the Khwar Al Amaya Oil Terminal and by querying vessels before they entered Iraqi waters. Germantown conducted "Presence Operations" throughout the Persian Gulf before returning to San Diego, California in August 2006.

Germantown departed for the Persian Gulf on 5 November 2007 to support Operation Enduring Freedom by transporting members of the 11th Marine Expeditionary Unit to Kuwait for field exercises. She then proceeded to conduct maritime security operations throughout the Persian Gulf and was later tasked with conducting oil platform defense in the narrow Shatt-Al-Arab waterway on the Iran-Iraq border. She returned home to San Diego on 3 June 2008 and began preparations for an extended mid-life overhaul to commence in the winter of 2008.

In January 2011, Germantown reversed the 2002 hull swap with Harpers Ferry, to return to Sasebo, and immediately proceeded to join the Essex Amphibious Ready Group for Cobra Gold 2011, a multinational exercise hosted annually by the Kingdom of Thailand.

Germantown was one of several ships participating in disaster relief after the 2011 Tōhoku earthquake and tsunami. The ship departed Sasebo in September 2011 for a patrol of the western Pacific. Accompanying the ship were Denver and Essex. In November 2013, Germantown and Ashland supported relief operations in the wake of Typhoon Haiyan.

In March 2014, the ship's commanding officer, Commander Jason Leach was relieved of duty by the head of the 7th Fleet's amphibious unit "due to a loss of confidence in his ability to command." News reports indicated that "The relief was not related to a single incident but was the result of a poor command climate on board the ship and the commanding officer's failure to use the good judgment expected of leaders in the navy and to uphold standards." In January 2015, the ship's command master chief Jesus Galura pleaded guilty to a number of charges stemming from an investigation into a prostitution procurement ring between him and four other chief petty officers on board the ship.

In December 2020, the U.S. Navy's Report to Congress on the Annual Long-Range Plan for Construction of Naval Vessels stated that the ship was planned to be placed Out of Commission in Reserve in 2023.. The Navy announced it would inactivate the USS Germantown on 29 September 2026.

On 15 October 2021 the Germantown completed ten years of forward deployed service in Japan and completed a homeport shift to San Diego.
