= USS Barnstable County =

Newport-class tank landing ship

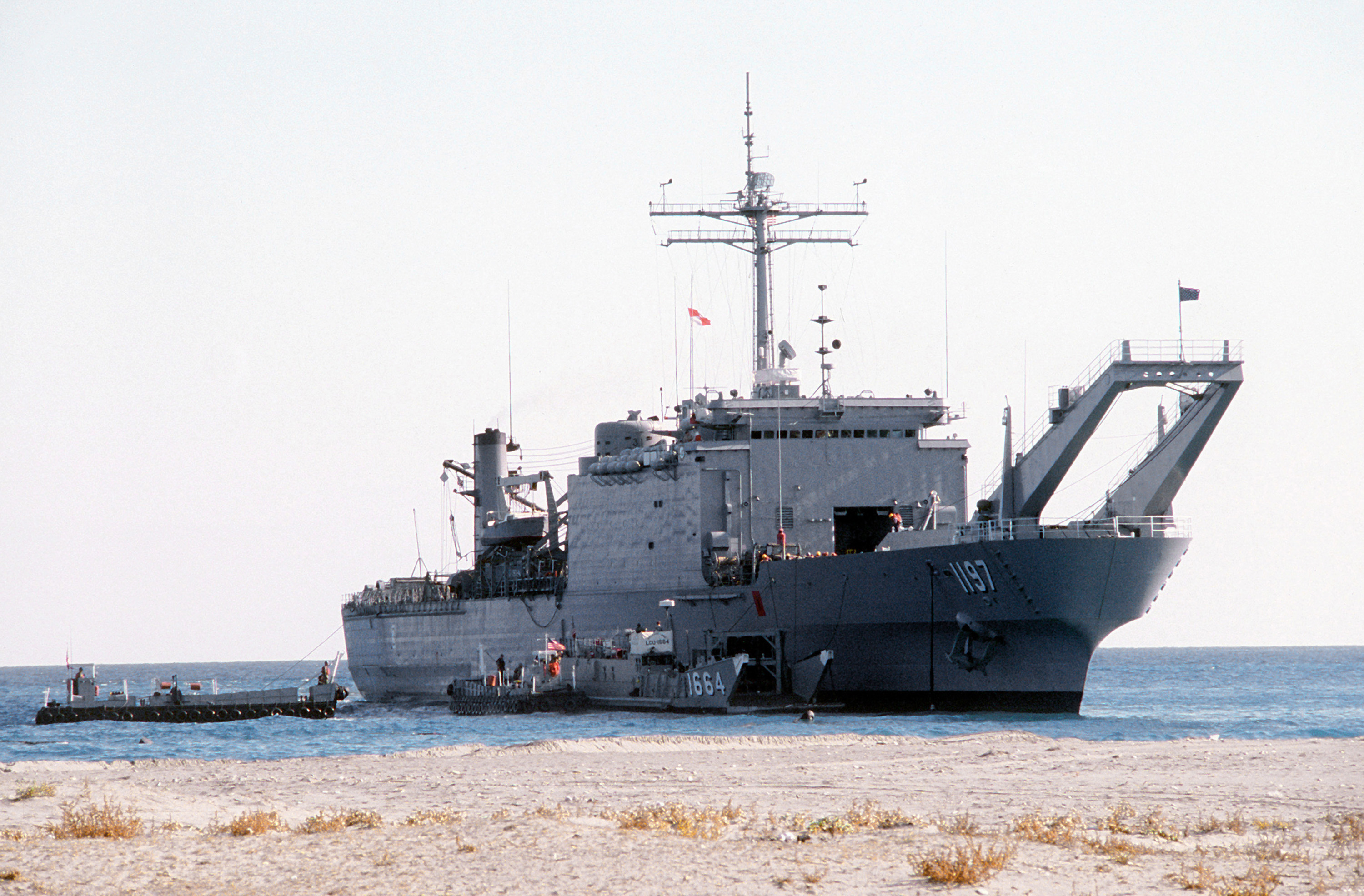

History

United States
- Name: Barnstable County
- Namesake: Barnstable County, Massachusetts
- Ordered: 15 July 1966
- Builder: National Steel and Shipbuilding Corporation
- Laid down: 19 December 1970
- Launched: 2 October 1971
- Acquired: 1 May 1972
- Commissioned: 27 May 1972
- Decommissioned: 29 June 1994
- Stricken: 23 July 2002
- Identification: LST-1197
- Fate: Sold to Spain, 22 August 1994

Spain
- Name: Hernán Cortés
- Namesake: Hernán Cortés
- Commissioned: 26 August 1994
- Decommissioned: 13 November 2009
- Identification: Pennant number L-41
- Fate: Sold for scrap, 2014

General characteristics
- Class & type: Newport-class tank landing ship
- Displacement: 8,792 long tons (8,933.1 t) full load
- Length: 522 ft (159.1 m)
- Beam: 70 ft (21.34 m)
- Draft: 19 ft (5.79 m)
- Propulsion: 6 × diesels; 16,000 hp; 2 × shafts; Single screw controllable pitch bow thruster
- Speed: 20 knots (37.0 km/h)
- Capacity: 17,300 sq ft (1,607.2 m^{2}) vehicle, 2,000 short tons (1,814.4 t) total (500 short tons (453.6 t) when beaching)
- Troops: 360-400 embarked troops
- Complement: 14 officers, 210 enlisted
- Armament: 4 × .50 cal (12.7 mm) machine guns; 1 × 20 mm Phalanx CIWS

USS Barnstable County (LST-1197) was the nineteenth ship of the Newport class of tank landing ships. She was laid down on 19 December 1970 at San Diego, California, by the National Steel and Shipbuilding Corporation and launched on 2 October 1971. She was commissioned on 27 May 1972. The ship was named after Barnstable County, Massachusetts.

== History ==
=== 1970s ===
Between 27 May and 24 July 1972, the tank landing ship completed fitting out, first at Long Beach and then at San Diego in July. On 24 July, she set sail from San Diego bound for her permanently assigned base of operations--Little Creek, Virginia She transited the Panama Canal on 7 August and arrived at Little Creek on 14 August. On 6 September, the ship got underway for Guantanamo Bay, Cuba, whence she conducted shakedown training until returning to Little Creek on 21 October. Barnstable County completed her final contract trials early in November and then settled into a training routine that lasted until the first week in December. At that time, she began an extended stay at Little Creek that carried her into the new year. After loading ammunition on 11 January 1973, she proceeded to Morehead City, North Carolina, to embark marines. From there, the tank landing ship set course for the West Indies where she visited Guantanamo Bay in Cuba, Vieques Island and Roosevelt Roads in Puerto Rico, and St. Thomas in the Virgin Islands before returning to Little Creek on 24 January. She carried out training landings at Onslow Beach, North Carolina, on 31 January and conducted independent ship's exercises on 1 and 2 February.

After spending the rest of February in port at Little Creek, Barnstable County got underway on 28 February, bound ultimately for the Philadelphia Naval Shipyard. She made completed a couple of brief collateral missions along the way and arrived in Philadelphia on 1 March. There she began her post-shakedown overhaul, an evolution that occupied her for all of March and the first two weeks of April. The ship returned to Little Creek on 13 April and commenced amphibious warfare training operations in nearby waters. These operations, largely preparations for her fall deployment to the West Indies as a unit of Caribbean Amphibious Ready Group (CARG) 2-73, took place all through the summer at either locations near Little Creek or at Onslow Beach on the North Carolina coast. In addition, they were coordinated with the training requirements for other military organizations as well. Thus, during her July missions, she introduced Naval Reserve Officers Training Corps (NROTC) midshipmen to amphibious warfare as a part of their summer cruise practical training. In August, she provided a similar opportunity to United States Marine Corps student officers.

On 4 September 1973, she departed Little Creek to deploy to the West Indies. She picked up marines at Morehead City on 5 September and resumed her voyage to Guantanamo Bay. Arriving there early on 9 September, Barnstable County opened her deployment with a landing exercise. For the next month, she participated in a series of amphibious warfare exercises at Vieques Island and made port calls at such places as Roosevelt Roads and San Juan in Puerto Rico and at Charlotte Amalie on St. Thomas in the Virgin Islands. On 8 October, the ship left San Juan to return home. She dropped the marines off at Morehead City on 11 October and reentered port at Little Creek on 12 October. She stayed at Little Creek for the rest of October but got underway for the Caribbean again on 1 November. Barnstable County picked up her marine contingent at Morehead City on 2 November and arrived at Colón, Panama in Panama on 6 November. On 7 November, she sailed to Cartagena, Colombia, for a five-day port call that included participation in the celebration of Colombia's national holiday on 11 November. She returned to Colón on 13 November to reembark her marines and, after a visit to the Dutch island of Curaçao between 17 and 20 November, set a course for Puerto Rico. Over the next three weeks, Barnstable County participated in a series of amphibious exercises carried out at nearby Vieques Island and Roosevelt Roads. When not engaged in the landing drills, she made port calls at such places as St. John on Antigua, St. Thomas in the Virgin Islands, and San Juan in Puerto Rico. On 10 December, the ship departed San Juan for the voyage via Morehead City to Little Creek. She reached her home port again on 14 December and stood down for the rest of the year.

The standdown extended well into January 1974. She did not get underway again until the third week in the month when she reembarked upon local training assignments. Even that return to activity, however, proved to be of short duration for she returned to port on 25 January and stayed there for almost 15 weeks. In mid-April, orders to prepare for an unscheduled Mediterranean deployment sent her crew to the administrative equivalent of general quarters. On 9 May, Barnstable County set out for European waters with the other ships of PhibRon 8. She took on marines at Morehead City on 10 May and then headed out across the Atlantic She arrived in Rota on 20 May and received word there of her assignment to the multinational effort to clear the Suez Canal of the sunken ships that had barred its passage since 1967. After amphibious exercises at Carbonaresl, Italy, and İzmir, Turkey, Barnstable County finally reached the Suez Canal on 8 June, though she did not actually enter Port Said until the next day.

Barnstable County relieved Inchon as the support ship for the canal-clearing operation. Inchon had supported the mine-clearing phase of the task, which had been conducted by helicopters. Barnstable County took over support duties largely consisting of communications and logistics responsibilities. On 22 June 1974, the tank landing ship made the six-hour transit of the canal south to her duty station at Ismailia. There, she rode at anchor in Lake Timsah for just over 15 weeks. On 8 October, Barnstable County made the canal passage north to Port Said where she was relieved of her duties by Boulder the following day. That afternoon, she began the long voyage back to Little Creek. Engineering problems with her main engines caused by bad fuel forced her to stop at Souda Bay, Crete, for two days to refuel and then she made a five-day liberty call at Palma de Majorca before arriving in Rota on 22 October. There, she refueled quickly and resumed her passage home that same evening. Barnstable County reentered Little Creek on 1 November. She spent the remainder of 1974 in port, engaged in post-deployment standdown at first and then in holiday standdown later.

Her extended period of inactivity finally came to an end in January 1975 when she began preparations for a deployment with the Caribbean amphibious ready group. She was underway from 7 to 10 January to load ammunition and to conduct independent ship's exercises and again from 14 to 16 January to carry out weapon systems training. On 23 January, Barnstable County embarked on her only deployment of 1975. After embarking marines at Morehead City, she set course for Roosevelt Roads, Puerto Rico, where she arrived on 1 February. For two weeks, the ship engaged in a variety of drills and exercises before damage to a bearing in her port shaft forced her into drydock at San Juan for repairs on 17 February. She completed those repairs by the end of February, and, after refueling on 1 March and reembarking the marines at Vieques on 2 March, laid in a course home. The marines disembarked at Morehead City on 6 March, and Barnstable County stood into Little Creek again the next day.

Following her return from the West Indies, the tank landing ship remained in port until the middle of April. At that time, she got underway to participate in some amphibious exercises conducted nearby during the third week in April. Barnstable County visited Washington, D.C., in May; and, early in June, she made two short cruises to Halifax, Nova Scotia, and back to Little Creek while serving as a training platform for NROTC midshipmen. The ship remained in port during July, but, in the first part August, she took up midshipman training once more with a voyage back to Halifax, this time by way of New York City. Refresher training occupied her during the rest of August and the first week in September and then she underwent two successive availabilities in preparation for overseas assignment at the beginning of 1976. That maintenance work ended late in October, and Barnstable County resumed local training operations out of Little Creek in November. Early in December, a board of inspection and survey visited the ship, and she carried out her last underway period of the year on 8–9 December in conjunction with that inspection.

The tank landing ship left Norfolk on 5 January 1976 and steamed to Morehead City, North Carolina, in company with the four other units of PhibRon 8; Spiegel Grove, Raleigh, Guadalcanal, and Charleston. Arriving at Morehead City on 6 January, the ships loaded the 34th Marine Amphibious Unit (34th MAU) for rehearsal landings at Onslow Beach. After completing the weather-delayed exercises, Barnstable County finally got underway for Rota, Spain, on 10 January. The Atlantic crossing proved difficult and took longer than anticipated because engineering problems plagued several ships of the squadron. Upon arrival in Rota turnover formalities proceeded quickly, and Barnstable County officially joined the 6th Fleet. Plans for a landing exercise on Spain's Atlantic coast had to be canceled as a result of civil war in Lebanon, and the squadron passed through the Strait of Gibraltar instead on its way to Augusta Bay, Sicily. The civil unrest in Lebanon dominated the ship's schedule for the remainder of the cruise.

During this first stop in the Mediterranean, Barnstable County anchored with the squadron at Sicily for a few days. In the course of the training anchorage visit there, a violent storm broke with winds exceeding 50 knots (93 km/h; 58 mph). Upon departing Augusta Bay after the storm subsided the ship headed for its first liberty port, Reggio di Calabria, on the Italian mainland. The ship arrived on 1 February and stayed until 6 February. Departing Reggio on a Friday the ship arrived at Brindisi, Italy, the following day for a seven-day training anchorage visit. The ship then proceeded to Villefranche, France, arriving on 16 February. Barnstable County left Villefranche on 23 February and proceeded to Monte Romano, Italy, where she carried out more amphibious training late in February. Early in March, the ship made a four-day port call at Naples, putting to sea again on 5 March bound for Sardinia to participate in NATO Exercise "Sardinia '76." After conducting a simulated opposed passage to Sardinia, Barnstable County sent her marines ashore in the first wave and then took little further part in the evolution. At the mission's conclusion, she reembarked the marines on 18 March and headed for Syracuse, Sicily, where her crew enjoyed a week of liberty.

On 26 March, urgent orders interrupted her employment schedule once again and sent her to a holding area just east of Crete in response to an intensification of the situation in Lebanon. For the first few weeks she steamed squares in the ocean while rehearsing contingency plans for a possible evacuation of Americans from Beirut. Despite the passage of time, the Lebanese political scene remained volatile; so the squadron moved to a deep water anchorage outside Crete's territorial waters. April and May came and went without any real change, except that, late in May, the squadron got underway and steamed closer to Lebanon. Finally, after 69 days at sea, a lull in the fighting coupled with negotiations in progress allowed Barnstable County to proceed to Naples for a scheduled port call. The visit lasted from 1 to 4 June, and, then the squadron left for an amphibious exercise conducted at Carboneras, Spain. At its end, the squadron returned to the eastern Mediterranean and resumed station off Lebanon.

This time, the squadron moved to within 30 miles (48 km) of the Lebanese coast. Spiegel Grove closed to within 25 miles (40 km) of the shore and dispatched an LCU to the beach while Barnstable County and the other ships stood by on station. After Spiegel Grove evacuated several hundred civilians, the squadron moved back near the coast of Crete, where its relief soon arrived. The turnover process, during which the new squadron assumed stand-by duties, lasted two days; and then Barnstable County shaped a westerly course for Rota. She reached Rota on 30 June and stayed there until 5 July when she embarked on a northerly passage home. Barnstable County arrived back in Little Creek on 15 July. Post-deployment leave and upkeep took up the rest of July and most of August.

On 20 August, the ship returned to sea to participate in Operation "Teamwork '76." That exercise comprised a North Atlantic cruise during which she transported equipment for a Marine Corps air wing. After a delayed transit and a fuel stop in Scotland, the ship finally reached the first stop on its exercise itinerary—Oslo, Norway. The marines disembarked there for a two weeks of training, and the ship departed for liberty calls at Trondheim, Norway, and Copenhagen, Denmark. After two rainy days in Trondheim and a week's stay at Copenhagen, Barnstable County returned to Oslo to reembark the marines and carry them to their next operation. On 1 October, the ship entered Esberg, Denmark, to unload equipment. After four days, she got underway for a liberty call at Nantes, France, where she served as the Navy's official representative at a celebration in honor of the Bicentennial of the United States. Getting underway on 11 October, the ship stopped next at Bremerhaven, Germany, arriving a week later and staying until 21 October. On 22 October, the ship moored at Esberg once more to load the marine gear. The ship made her final port visit of the cruise—at Portsmouth, England—between 26 and 29 October.

Barnstable County got underway to return to the United States on 29 October. She stopped at Morehead City on 9 November to disembark the marines and unload their equipment and then headed north to Little Creek where she arrived on 11 November. Between 29 November and 3 December, the ship got underway for one final amphibious exercise period. For the rest of the month, she prepared for the Caribbean exercise scheduled for early January 1977.

On 13 January 1977, Barnstable County sailed from Little Creek as part of Atlantic Amphibious Ready Group (LARG) 3-76. She and the other ships of PhibRon 8 loaded elements of the 34th Marine Amphibious Unit (34th MAU) on 14 January in Morehead City, North Carolina. On 16 January, the unit conducted a rehearsal landing at Onslow Beach. The following day, the constituent elements of LARG 3-76 rendezvoused and headed south to Vieques Island near Puerto Rico. The LARG rehearsed the landing on 22 January and then carried out the actual exercise on the following day. After reloading the 34th MAU, the LARG departed Vieques on 26 January for port visits in Puerto Rico and the Virgin Islands. Barnstable County left San Juan on 30 January and headed back to Vieques for another landing exercise, a major multilateral operation involving British, Brazilian, and Dutch forces in addition to those of the Navy and Marine Corps. At the conclusion of their participation, the Dutch marines embarked in Barnstable County, and the tank landing ship returned them to their base on Curaçao. She met up with the LARG again briefly at Vieques on 12 February before making a three-day port visit to Fredericksted, St. Croix. She rejoined the LARG to conduct Fleet exercises and transit back to Little Creek. The ship landed the marines at Morehead City on 22 February and reentered her home port the next day.

Scheduled underway time for Barnstable County became more limited for the next several months. During March, the ship participated in local operations consisting primarily of training with marine reservists on Anzio Beach at Little Creek. In April, crew members took advantage of an opportunity to fill gaps in their training while the ship underwent various inspections and carried out exercises in port. She returned to sea in May to participate in the joint Exercise "Solid Shield 77." After some "wet net" training with the Army in the first week of May, preparations were begun to load causeways and embark marines. On 12 May, the ship headed south for Morehead City, arriving the following day. During the unloading that followed the landing, Barnstable County helped refine some new techniques for discharging fuel from LSTs. The first operations involved refueling minesweepers while at anchor. A rig was streamed aft and four MSOs were refueled in succession. The following day fuel was pumped ashore via a buoyed pipeline. All the bulk fuel the ship carried for marine vehicles was pumped to a reservoir on shore. The operation proved entirely successful. Barnstable County then returned to Little Creek early on 23 May.

At the beginning of June, the ship proceeded to its next assignment—as visit ship at Annapolis, Maryland during the Naval Academy's June Week. She returned to Little Creek on 8 June and resumed local duty until the end of the month. On 30 June, the ship headed up Chesapeake Bay once again, this time ascending the Potomac River to Washington, D. C. That weekend the ship moored at the Washington Navy Yard, where she hosted a throng of visitors ship during the Independence Day holiday. After returning to Little Creek on 5 July, Barnstable County embarked Marine Corps reservists later in the week for a training exercise at Onslow Beach on the North Carolina coast. The exercise began on 11 July and continued through 19 July. She carried out two more reserve training landings at Little Creek's Anzio Beach during the last week of July and the first week in August. On 10 August, she headed for the West Indies once more to serve as a launch platform for target drone missiles. Barnstable County made a three-day port visit at Nassau in the Bahamas before picking up the drones at Roosevelt Roads, Puerto Rico. After the exercise, she spent several days in St. Thomas, and then steamed back to Little Creek.

On 19 September, the ship left Little Creek for a delayed and much needed overhaul which was to be completed in two phases and at two different yards. The first phase, carried out at the Maryland Shipbuilding & Drydock Co. in Baltimore, Maryland, began late in September and lasted until 7 December. After that, Barnstable County stood back down Chesapeake Bay bound for Horne Brothers Shipyard in Newport News, Virginia, conducting sea trials as she went. The ship began the second phase at the Horne Brothers yard on 9 December with an anticipated completion date of 2 May 1978. She commenced sea trials late in May and returned to duty with PhibRon 8 on 2 June 1978. On 18 June, the ship arrived at Guantanamo Bay, Cuba, and commenced three weeks of refresher training. Immediately upon return from the West Indies, the ship launched into three weeks of amphibious refresher training at Little Creek, Virginia

Between 30 July and 12 August, she served as the launching platform for five BQM-34 target drones used to test missile systems in COMTUEX 4-78. On 21 August, the tank landing ship sailed for Morehead City, where she embarked marines and loaded vehicles for Exercise "Northern Wedding" a multinational exercise that stressed cooperation between NATO members and in which over 100 ships from 10 countries took part. The exercise commenced on 23 August with Barnstable County serving with the attached ARG. After 21 days of steaming, the ship arrived in Brunsbüttelkoog, Germany, to disembark her passengers. From that point, the mission of the cruise changed. The emphasis shifted from military preparedness to cultural exchange. The ports visited included Kiel, Germany; Edinburgh, Scotland; Copenhagen, Denmark; and Brest, France. She returned to Little Creek on 30 October and, except for a short underway off the North Carolina coast between 27 November and 7 December, spent the rest of the year there in an upkeep status.

The new year of 1979 found Barnstable County completing preparation for a five-month Mediterranean deployment. On 10 January 1979, she departed Little Creek in company with her PhibRon 2 squadron mates—Inchon, Austin, Spiegel Grove and Spartanburg County—a total of five ships that also comprised MARG 1-79. On 11 January, the unit arrived in Morehead City, and Barnstable County embarked elements of Battalion Landing Team (BLT) 3/8. The ship sailed from Morehead City to Onslow Beach, where she loaded 14 LVTs. From there, MARG 1-79 embarked on a 12-day Atlantic crossing, arriving at Rota, Spain, on 23 January. After relieving her counterpart in LARG 3-78, the tank landing ship left Rota on 26 January as a unit of the 6th Fleet. She called at Almeria, Spain, between 27 January and 1 February and then headed for the vicinity of Carboneras, Spain, where she conducted amphibious drills with MARG 1-79 units. Following an availability carried out from 10 to 23 February at Barcelona, Spain, the ship joined units of the 6th Fleet and of the Italian Navy in a "National Week" exercise. Barnstable County then spent a fortnight in Naples from 10 to 24 March before setting a course for the Greek coast to conduct amphibious operations off Vatica. She completed that mission on 31 March and returned to Naples for availability alongside Sierra. The ship departed Naples on 6 April and anchored near Pania de Spila on 17 April to conduct amphibious training. Ten days later, she set sail for Toulon, France, arriving on 28 April.

Barnstable County departed Toulon on 2 May bound for Palma, Spain, which port she visited from 3 to 7 May. Returning to Toulon, she embarked elements of the Norwegian and Dutch Armies and put to sea again on 9 May to participate in the multinational Exercise "Dawn Patrol." The ship conducted rehearsal landings at Capo Teulado, Sardinia, on 13 and 14 May and then carried the actual assault exercise at Doganbey Bay, Turkey, on 25 May. The ship arrived back in Toulon on 28 May, disembarked the Allied troops, and sailed for Rota, arriving there on 31 May. Units of MARG 1-79 conducted its turnover with units of MARG 2-79 and sailed for home on 6 June. The ship stopped at Morehead City, on 18 June to disembark the marines and unload the 14 LVTs before continuing on to Little Creek that same day. She arrived back in Little Creek on 19 June. The ship remained in its home port until 26 July at which time she sailed north to New Haven, Connecticut, where she carried out training for the Naval Reserve unit based there. On 1 August, Barnstable County departed New Haven to arrive in Little Creek on 9 August.

She spent the next four weeks getting ready for overseas movement. On 11 September, Barnstable County sailed from Little Creek with Amphibious Group (PhibGru) 2 in Task Group (TG) 21.1. On 12 September, the ship first stopped at Morehead City to embark elements of HQRLT-8 and then at Onslow Beach to load LVTs. From there, Barnstable County then set out across the Atlantic. After an expeditious passage, she entered the Mediterranean and made for Capo Teulado, Sardinia, where she arrived on 27 September. At Capo Teulado, all participants of Exercise "Display Determination 79" rendezvous and conducted rehearsal landings. On 1 October, she sailed in company with 11 other ships to Saros Bay, Turkey, arriving there on 8 October. For a period of 10 days, this multinational force conducted rehearsals and cross-deck training. On 18 October, Barnstable County set out for Barcelona. She reached her destination on 22 October and pursued five days of liberty, returning to sea on 27 October for the voyage back to Rota and turnover formalities. The stop at Rota lasted from 29 October to 1 November, at which time she headed back across the Atlantic. The ship took a somewhat circuitous route home, steaming by way of the Virgin Islands and, from there, around Puerto Rico through the Windward Passage up the Old Bahama Channel skirting the eastern fringe of the Florida Strait and then along the east coast to Morehead City. Barnstable County disembarked the marines at Morehead City on 18 November and then sailed for Little Creek, where she arrived the next day.

=== 1980s ===
She spent the rest of 1979 and the first two weeks of 1980 in port engaged in post-deployment leave and upkeep. The ship resumed normal operations on 14 January when she put to sea to participate in READEX 1-80. En route to Puerto Rico, she paused at Onslow Beach for four days from 15 to 19 January to allow reservists to train in LVT operations. Underway again on 20 January, she proceeded to Roosevelt Roads, Puerto Rico, where she arrived four days later. Barnstable County spent the night of 24 January in port after loading four drones and proceeded the next day to the Mobil Sea Range, near the Bahamas. Upon successfully launching and completing the portion of an air exercise, she returned to Roosevelt Roads to unload the drone launching equipment and refuel before get underway for Freeport in the Bahamas for a five-day liberty call at the beginning of February. The ship returned to Little Creek on 14 February. There, she spent the next 12 days preparing to be visited by a board of inspection and survey. She got underway briefly on 28 and 29 February to load ammunition. Back at Little Creek on 1 March, she completed her preparations for the inspection only to have it canceled by record snow storms. The ship remained busy, however, getting ready to deploy overseas.

Those preparations shifted into high gear on 14 April when Barnstable County got underway in company with Guadalcanal, Nashville, and La Moure County for Bloodsworth Island to conduct a simulated night raid and gun shoot along the way. The task group took a break from the work of readying itself for its mission as MARG 2-80 when it visited Newport, Rhode Island, during the third week in April. The task force concluded its visit on 20 April and headed for Onslow Beach, North Carolina, where it trained from 22 to 24 April, and then proceeded to Camp Pendleton, Virginia, for an early morning assault rehearsal on 25 April. She spent the last weekend in April at Little Creek and returned to Onslow Beach to complete the final week of pre-deployment training. She returned to Little Creek on 2 May for a month of final preparations for overseas movement. The tank landing ship began her Mediterranean deployment on 4 June. She stopped at Morehead City the next day to embark marines, and then stood out across the Atlantic.

Barnstable County arrived at Rota on 17 June 1980, completed turnover procedures with MARG 1-80, and departed Rota on 21 June. She entered the Mediterranean Sea and proceeded to Carboneras, Spain, where she participated in eight days of amphibious training at the end of June. At the end of those evolutions, she called at Palma de Majorca over the Independence Day holiday. Back at sea on 5 July, Barnstable County set a course for the Tunisian coast of North Africa, where she took part in training operations in cooperation with the Tunisian Army and Navy during the second week in July. From there, her task group steamed for the Suez Canal through which it passed on 17 July. After navigating the Gulf of Suez, the Red Sea, and the Gulf of Aden, she proceeded down the east coast of Africa to Mombasa, Kenya where she made a three-day port call at the end of the month. She left Mombasa with the task group on 31 July and headed back toward the Mediterranean.

Re-transiting the canal on 9 August, her unit set course for Kalamata, Greece and a three-day liberty call from 11 to 14 August. From 16 to 19 August, she visited Alexandria, Egypt and then got underway for Naples, Italy where she spent almost two weeks in upkeep. Leaving Naples on 6 September, Barnstable County and her colleagues conducted amphibious exercises at Plan de Spille, Italy, from 8 to 14 September. The task group then stopped at Toulon, France, where the ship underwent a restricted availability between 17 and 29 September. From there, she proceeded to Asinara Bay for amphibious exercises on 30 September and 1 October. Two days of operations at Caronari, Sardinia, followed on 4 and 5 October, after which the ship proceeded to Capo Teulado, Sardinia, where she took part in Exercise "Display Determination 80" between 7 and 9 October. The ship tied up in Barcelona, Spain, the next day but made an emergency departure early on 12 October to aid in earthquake relief in Algeria. En route, however, she received notification that her assistance was unnecessary and orders to alter course for Málaga, Spain, where her crew enjoyed two days of liberty on 15 and 16 October.

Leaving Málaga on 17 October, she moored in Rota the next day, completed turnover procedures with MARG 3-80, and set out to return home on 22 October. Traveling once again by way of the West Indies, Barnstable County conducted gunnery exercises near Roosevelt Roads, Puerto Rico on 2 November before heading through the Old Bahama Channel and then north along the east coast. She moored at Morehead City on 8 November, disembarked troops, and resumed her passage home. The ship moored at Little Creek on 9 November and spent the remainder of the year in a leave and upkeep period.

On 7 August 1986, the LST entered the Metro Machine Corporation Yard in Norfolk for a drydock maintenance availability. The ship remained there until 15 December, when she moved back to Little Creek for an additional upkeep period. Barnstable County got underway for refresher training off Cuba on 13 February 1987, loaded an engineering support battalion at Morehead City the next day, and reached Guantanamo Bay on the 21. During the transit, the LST also supported boat inspections by an embarked USCG Law Enforcement Detachment (LED). Completing the refresher training in late March, the ship visited both St. Thomas and Miami, Fla., before returning to Little Creek on 4 April. The crew then prepared for a major south Atlantic training cruise, scheduled for the summer. Departing Little Creek on 10 June 1987, Barnstable County began a series of goodwill visits to West African ports, starting with Praia in the Cape Verde Islands, and then stopping in Dakar, Senegal; Banjul, Gambia; Bissau, Guinea-Bissau; Conakry, Guinea; Freetown, Sierra Leone; and Monrovia, Liberia. During these visits, the crew made courtesy visits with local officials, delivered Project Handclasp aid materials, including medical equipment, and helped repair equipment and facilities, including the radar in the Gambian patrol craft Jatto. The ship then sailed to Roosevelt Roads, Puerto Rico, to prepare for her next mission: participation in UNITAS XXVIII, a series of joint operations with South American navies. Putting to sea on 28 July 1987, Barnstable County conducted an underway launch of landing craft at Vieques Island with the Venezuelan Navy before turning south toward Barbados. On 2 August, a sailor fell overboard but was rescued in 10 minutes by the small boat detachment, thus proving the efficacy of man overboard drills. Following a short stop at Bridgetown, Barbados, the LST continued south to Brazil, visiting Recife and Salvador before stopping in Rio de Janeiro on 25 August. The tank landing ship then conducted a three-day amphibious exercise with Brazilian Marines on Marambaia Island. Enroute to Uruguay on 7 September 1987, Barnstable County conducted operations with both Brazilian and Uruguayan ships before arriving at Montevideo on the 13th. After a two-day visit, the LST continued south, transited the Straits of Magellan, and arrived at Talcahuano, Chile, on 29 September. Owing to damage caused by heavy seas off Argentina, the tank landing ship moved to Asmar Shipyard there for almost two weeks of voyage repairs. Underway again on 10 October, the Barnstable County visited Valparaiso, Chile; Ancon, Peru; and Manta, Ecuador during her voyage north to the equator. She also conducted amphibious operations with Chilean, Peruvian and Ecuadorian forces while en route. After crossing the equator on 12 November, the LST sailed north to Panama, transiting the canal on the 17th, and conducting a final exercise with the Colombian Navy two days later. The ship returned to Little Creek after this long deployment on 29 November. Following a two-month leave and upkeep period, the LST moved to Metro Machine Corp. yard in Norfolk on 29 January 1988 for a four-month maintenance availability. With repairs complete on 6 June, the amphibious ship spent the next three weeks preparing for refresher training in the West Indies. Sailing south on 28 June, Barnstable County shaped course for Jamaica, arriving in Kingston on 3 July. There, the crew celebrated Independence Day with a reception on the flight deck for the diplomatic community. Underway on the 5th, the ship continued south, arriving at Guantanamo Bay the next day, and conducted interim refresher training there until 3 August. The LST then returned home to Little Creek, mooring there on the 6th. In early October 1988, after training and engineering inspections, Barnstable County again headed south on the 7th, this time for the Pacific Ocean. She briefly stopped for a port visit in Puerto Cortez, Honduras, before transiting the Panama Canal on 18 October. The ship then carried out special operations in the Pacific until 10 November when she put into Rodman, Panama. The LST re-transited the Panama Canal on 14 November and, after a short visit to Cartagena, Colombia, returned to Little Creek on 23 November. In early 1989, Barnstable County began preparations for a Mediterranean deployment. These included several inspections, another repair period at Metro Machine and a MARG workup in late April. After loading troops and vehicles at Morehead City on 30 May, the LST sailed for the Mediterranean the following day. Arriving at Rota following an uneventful passage, the MARG inchopped to the Sixth Fleet on 17 June. The LST put to sea the next day, for a week-long exercise at Sierra de Retin, following which the ship anchored at Villefranche, France, for a port visit on 30 June. Barnstable County continued east on 6 July, transiting the Straits of Messina on the 8th and mooring at Haifa, Israel, on the 11th.- She then moved southwest on 28 July, for a three-day port visit to Alexandria, Egypt. The LST then sailed west and moored at Naples on 6 September to prepare for Exercise Display Determination. During that NATO operation, Barnstable County conducted an amphibious exercise with Italian LSTs at Capo Teulado, Sardinia, between 13 and 18 September. Later in the month, the LST joined Turkish warships for a transit exercise to Saros Bay, Turkey, where she anchored on the 26th. The tank landing ship sailed west on 5 October, transited the Straits of Gibraltar on the 9 and moored at Rota the next day to unload vehicles. She then joined Nassau and Shreveport for the move to Lisbon, Portugal, mooring there on 11 October for voyage repairs in the Lisnave Shipyard. The next day, a liberty party had an incident ashore that led to the beating and arrest of several Sailors and Marines by Portuguese police. The crew members were quickly released, however, and the U.S. Government received an official apology for the incident.- Departing Lisbon on 20 October, Barnstable County carried out one last exercise, that time with Spanish LSTs L-111 and L-112, at Galera before sailing for home on 28 October. After dropping off her embarked Marines on 9 November, the ship moored at Little Creek the next day.

In late 1988, the ship transited the Panama Canal, and cruised off the coast of Central America for several weeks. She also made a port visit to Cartagena, Colombia in this time period.

=== 1990s ===
In 1993, Barnstable County finally visited its namesake Barnstable County. It sailed through the Cape Cod Canal, its top just barely clearing the two bridges. During this approximate time, the main battery of 3" (76mm) guns was removed, and replaced with 25mm cannon.

=== Spanish Navy ===
Barnstable County was decommissioned on 29 June 1994 and transferred to the Spanish Navy through the Security Assistance Program, entering service on 29 August as Hernán Cortés (L-41), named after the 16th century conquistador. She retired from active service in 2009 and was scrapped at Las Palmas de Gran Canaria in 2014.

== See also ==
- USS Cape Cod (AD-43)
- USS Barnstable
