= John W. Miller =

American admiral

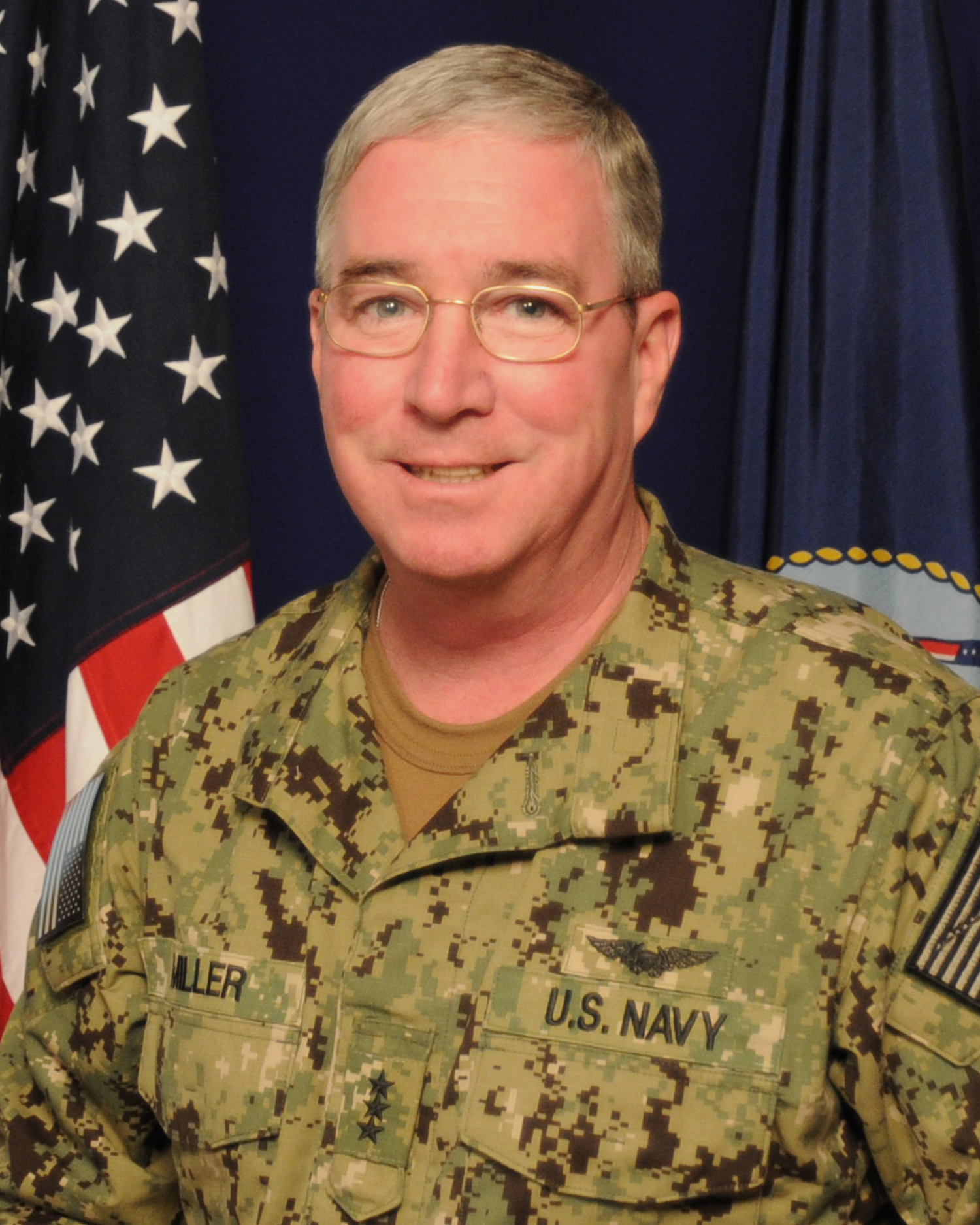
- Vice Admiral John W. Miller, USN
- Military career
- Allegiance: United States of America
- Branch: United States Navy
- Service years: 1979–2015
- Rank: Vice Admiral
- Nickname: Fozzie
- Commands: U.S. Naval Forces Central Command; Carrier Strike Group Eleven; Fighter Squadron 142; Fighter Squadron 101; USS Dubuque (LPD-8); USS Juneau (LPD-10); USS Constellation (CV-64); USS John F. Kennedy (CV-67)
- Conflicts: Operation Iraqi Freedom
- Awards: Navy Distinguished Service Medal; Defense Superior Service Medal; Bronze Star; Legion of Merit; Meritorious Service Medal; Strike Flight Air Medal; Navy and Marine Corps Commendation Medal; Navy and Marine Corps Achievement Medal

John W. "Fozzie" Miller is a retired United States Navy Vice Admiral who last served as Commander, U.S. Naval Forces Central Command/Commander, U.S. Fifth Fleet, based in Manama, Bahrain. Prior to assuming the duties of NAVCENT/C5F, Miller was special assistant to the Deputy Chief of Naval Operations for Operations, Plans, and Strategy (N3/N5) in Washington, D.C. He has also served as NAVCENT deputy commander.

== Biography ==
=== Early life ===
He graduated from the Naval War College and received a master's degree in International Relations from Salve Regina University.

=== Military career ===
He was commissioned an Ensign upon graduating from the U.S. Naval Academy in 1979, and received his Naval Flight Officer designation in 1980, after which he reported to VF-101 for training in the F-14A Tomcat. His sea duty includes tours as a division officer in VF-31; maintenance officer at VF-84; and six command tours: VF-142; VF-101; USS Dubuque; USS Juneau; USS Constellation, as her final commanding officer; and USS John F. Kennedy. As a flag officer, Miller also commanded Carrier Strike Group 11.

Ashore, he has served as an instructor at VF-101; leadership section head at the Naval Academy; a White House Fellowship as special assistant to the NASA Administrator; and aviation commander assignment officer at the Bureau of Naval Personnel. Since being promoted to flag rank, Miller has had particular focus on the CENTCOM area of responsibility, serving as deputy commander of NAVCENT/Fifth Fleet; deputy director, Strategy, Plans, and Policy (J5); and as CENTCOM chief of staff. He has also commanded the US Navy Strike and Air Warfare Center.

=== Retirement and Later Work ===
Miller was named to the position of Deputy Chief of Naval Operations for Plans, Policy, and Operations (N3/N5) in March 2014. However, his planned successor was unable to assume the Commander Fifth Fleet/Naval Forces Central Command role due to being under investigation as part of the Fat Leonard scandal, one of several flag officers not involved in the scandal who had transfers and promotions delayed due to the investigations.

Miller retired from the Navy in 2015. Since retirement, he has worked with the Middle East Institute and the American Enterprise Institute. He was also named a non-resident senior fellow for the Atlantic Council working on their Gulf Security Task Force and an associate fellow for Strategy, Technology and Arms Control at the International Institute for Strategic Studies. As a member of the Gulf Security Task Force, Miller published a detailed report on strategies for improving Gulf security.

In addition to his work with various think tanks, Miller has served as a Foundation Trustee for the United States Naval Academy and as a Highly Qualified Expert and Senior Mentor to the U.S. Naval War College, providing advice and expertise to the U.S. Navy on a wide range of operational and educational subjects.

=== Awards and decorations ===
Vice Admiral Miller has amassed over 3,500 flight hours and 1,000 arrested landings from six different carriers. His awards include:

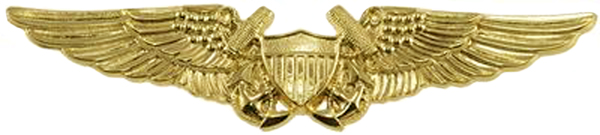

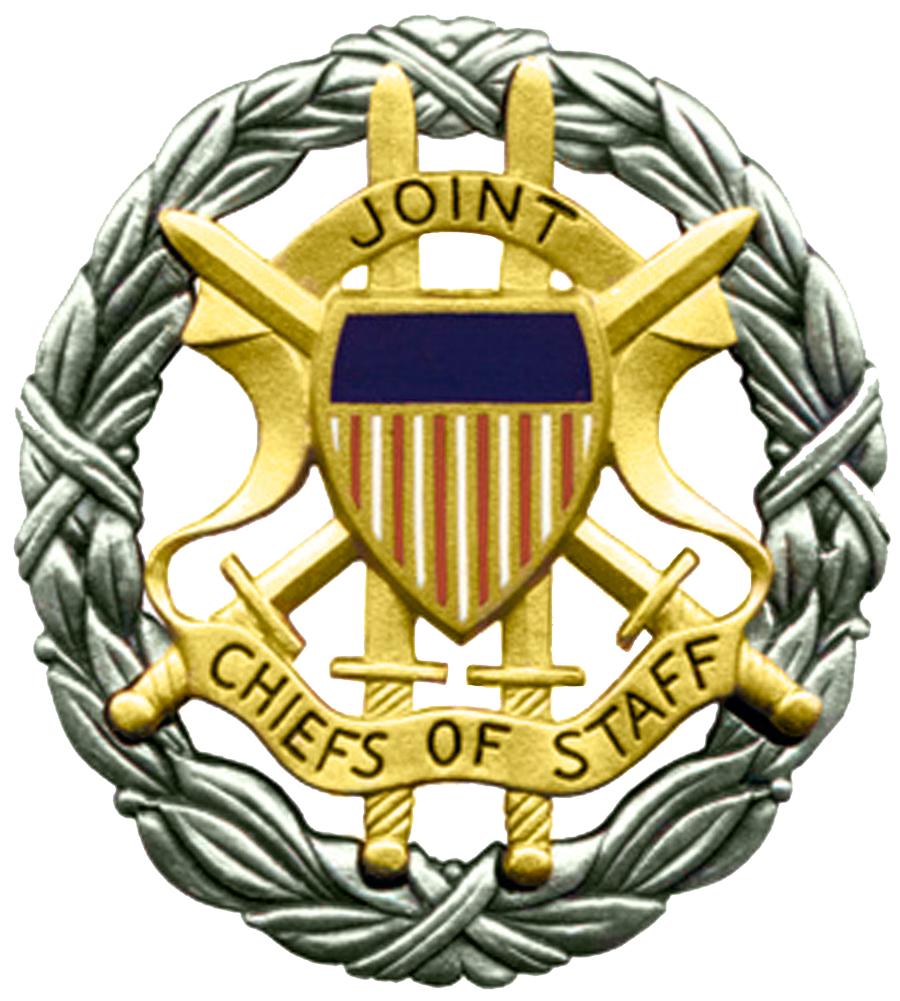

Naval Flight Officer insignia			Joint Chiefs of Staff ID Badge
Navy Distinguished Service Medal	Defense Superior Service Medal (2)	Legion of Merit (5)	Joint Chiefs of Staff ID Badge
Bronze Star	Meritorious Service Medal (3)	Air Medal with 2 Strike/Flights	Joint Chiefs of Staff ID Badge
Navy & Marine Corps Commendation Medal (5)	Navy and Marine Corps Achievement Medal	Joint Meritorious Unit Award (2)	Joint Chiefs of Staff ID Badge
Navy Unit Commendation	Navy Meritorious Unit Commendation (5)	Battle Efficiency Ribbon (4)	Joint Chiefs of Staff ID Badge
Navy Expeditionary Medal	National Defense Service Medal (2)	Southwest Asia Service Medal w/1 Campaign star	Joint Chiefs of Staff ID Badge
Iraq Campaign Medal	Global War on Terrorism Expeditionary Medal	Global War on Terrorism Service Medal	Joint Chiefs of Staff ID Badge
Armed Forces Service Medal	Humanitarian Service Medal	Navy Sea Service Deployment Ribbon (8)	Joint Chiefs of Staff ID Badge
Navy & Marine Corps Overseas Service Ribbon	NATO Medal for Yugoslavia	Pistol Expert Marksmanship Medal	Joint Chiefs of Staff ID Badge
