= USS Coronado (AGF-11) =

Austin-class amphibious transport dock

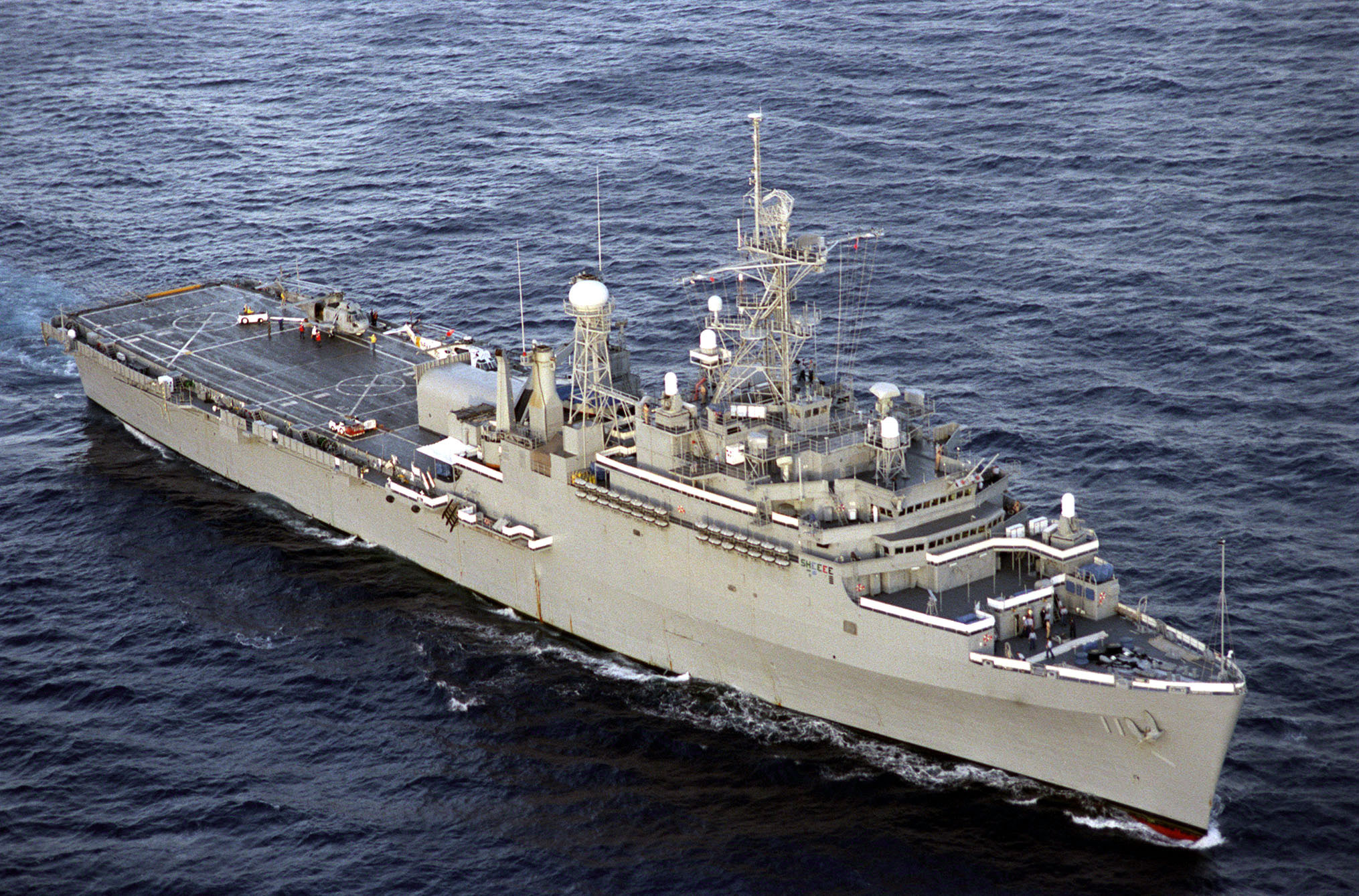
- USS Coronado in 1998

History

United States
- Name: Coronado
- Namesake: City of Coronado, California
- Ordered: 15 May 1964
- Builder: Lockheed Shipbuilding
- Laid down: 3 May 1965
- Launched: 30 July 1966
- Commissioned: 23 May 1970
- Decommissioned: 30 September 2006
- Reclassified: AGF
- Refit: 1980 (conversion from LPD to AGF)
- Home port: NAVSTA San Diego, California, U.S.
- Motto: Semper Ductor (Always a Leader)
- Nickname(s): "The Death Star"
- Fate: Sunk as part of live-fire exercise Valiant Shield 12 September 2012.
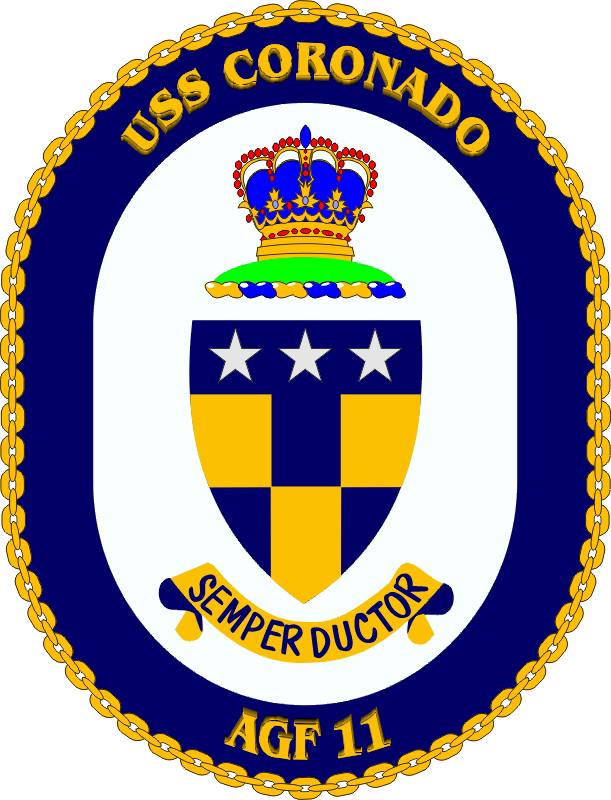
- Badge

General characteristics
- Class & type: Austin-class amphibious transport dock
- Tonnage: 5,527 DWT
- Displacement: 16,405 long tons (16,668 t) full; 10,878 long tons (11,053 t) light
- Length: 568 ft 11 in (173.4 m) overall; 547 ft 11 in (167 m) waterline
- Beam: 107 ft 11 in (32.9 m) extreme; 84 ft 0 in (25.6 m) waterline
- Draft: 22 ft 0 in (6.7 m) maximum; 23 ft 0 in (7 m) limit
- Propulsion: steam, 2 Foster Wheeler 650 psi (4,500 kPa) modified D type boilers.
- Speed: 21 knots (39 km/h; 24 mph)
- Complement: Crew: AGF 11: 516 and 120 Staff https://www.navysite.de/ships/agf11.htm

USS Coronado (AGF-11) (originally LPD-11) was the second ship of the United States Navy to be named after Coronado, California. She was designed as an Austin-class amphibious transport dock (LPD), one of seven fitted with an additional superstructure level for command ship duties. The ship was launched on 1 July 1966, commissioned on 23 May 1970, and became the most advanced command ship in the world. The ship was the second combatant ship in the United States Navy to integrate women as full-time crew members.

Coronado was decommissioned on 30 September 2006, was used for target practice during Valiant Shield 2012 exercises, and was sunk in the Marianas Island Range Complex on 12 September 2012.

== History ==
The Coronado's keel was laid down on 1 May 1965 by the Lockheed Shipbuilding and Construction Company of Seattle, Washington. She was launched on 1 July 1966. After two years of labor shortages and a 12-month strike, she was commissioned 23 May 1970.

First assigned to the U.S. Atlantic Fleet in the 1970s, Coronado conducted extensive operations, deploying on numerous occasions to the Caribbean Sea and Mediterranean Sea, as well as northern Europe.

In 1980, the Coronado was re-designated an Auxiliary Command Ship (AGF-11). Her first assignment was to relieve the USS La Salle as command ship for Commander, U.S. Middle East Force, stationed in the Persian Gulf.

Reassigned in October 1985, the Coronado relieved USS Puget Sound as the command ship of Commander, U.S. Sixth Fleet. During a ten-month tour with the Sixth Fleet, Coronado operated out of Gaeta, Italy, participating in operations in the Gulf of Sidra and strikes against Libyan terrorist support facilities.

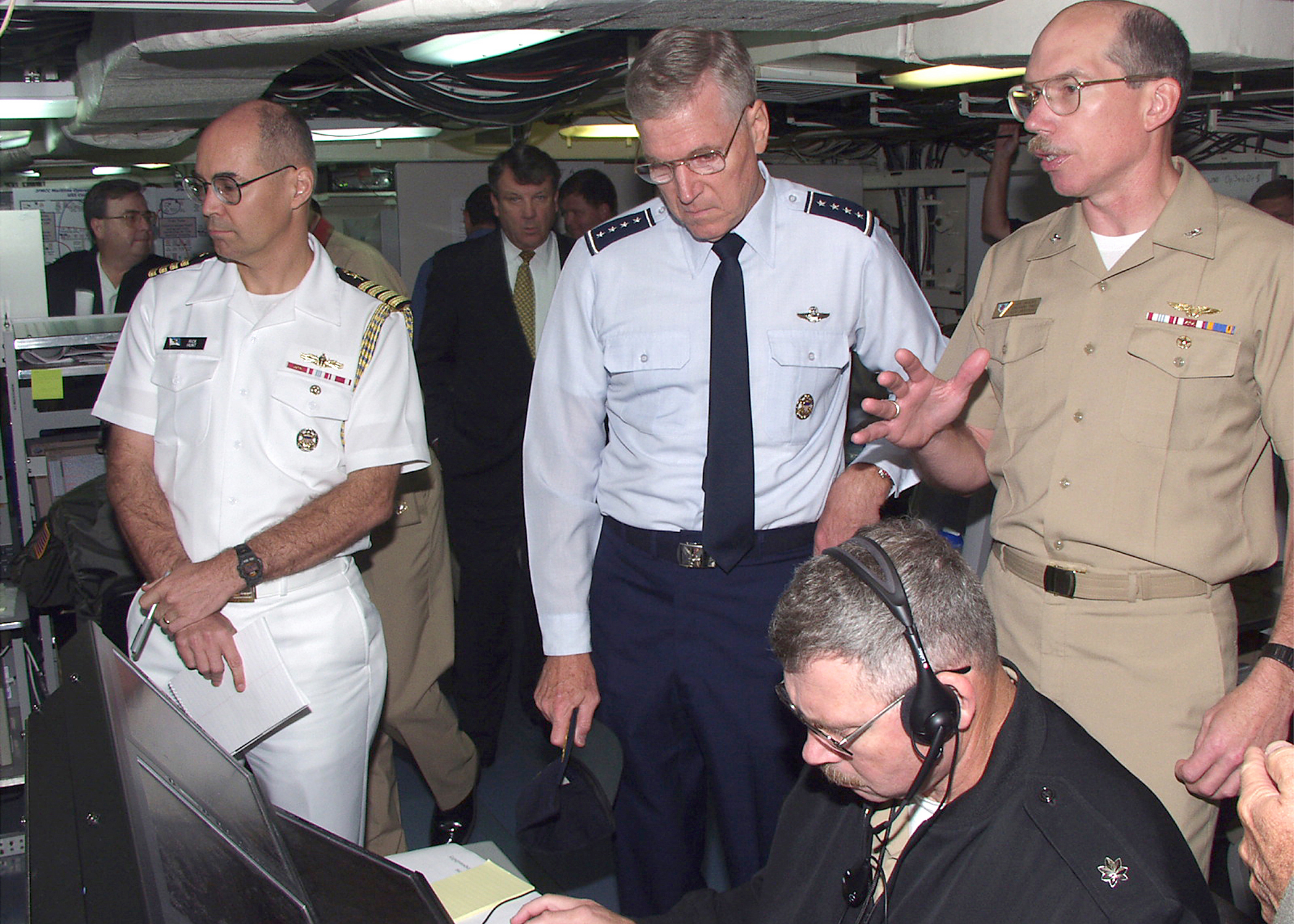
Chairman of the Joint Chiefs of Staff General Richard B. Myers during a visit to Coronado on 30 July 2002

In July 1986, the Coronado was relieved as Sixth Fleet command ship and ordered to Pearl Harbor, Hawaii, to become the command ship for Commander, U.S. 3rd Fleet. The admiral and his staff embarked on board Coronado in November 1986. Subsequently, Coronado was relieved as Third Fleet command ship and deployed to the Persian Gulf to assume duties as command ship for Commander, U.S. Middle East Force in January 1988. During this period she served as flagship for Operation Praying Mantis, the largest American naval action since World War II.

Upon her return to Pearl Harbor on 9 November 1988, Coronado again assumed her duties as Commander, U.S. Third Fleet command ship. USS Coronado remained homeported in Hawaii until August 1991, when crew and staff changed homeports to San Diego.

On 28 February 1994, Coronado became the first combatant ship in the United States Navy to embark women as part of its regular, full-time crew. Since then, Third Fleet and Coronado had become the center for naval innovation and technology experimentation. In November 1998 a large ship modification was completed. Incorporating the latest network-centric technology, Coronado became the most advanced command ship in the world.

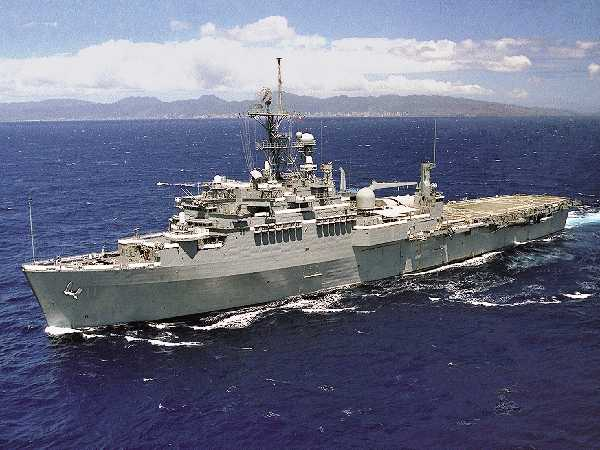
Coronado underway at sea in 1990

=== Sea-Based Battle Lab ===
In October 2001, the Office of the Secretary of the Navy assigned Coronado to host the Navy's Sea-Based Battle Lab (SBBL), an afloat platform for testing prototype systems and software, evaluating future naval capabilities, and assessing operational compatibility and possible further implementation throughout the United States Navy.

Developments in technology spawned advances in naval warfare capabilities. Wireless and web-based tools, along with new weapon systems, enabled naval forces to conduct precision operations with greater synchronization, expedience, and potency. With over 16,000 square feet (1,500 m^{2}) of reconfigurable command space and a advanced naval C4I suites, SBBL offered a unique shipboard environment that facilitates the evaluation of research for maritime and joint operations.

The Third Fleet J9 Directorate was responsible for managing the SBBL. Partnered with other services, national laboratories, academia, and industry, the Third Fleet staff developed joint exercises and experiments for evaluating the following in an operational environment:

- JTF Command Center organization and configuration
- Tactics, techniques, and procedures
- Naval and joint doctrine
- Biometrics (human feature recognition)
- Wireless applications
- Knowledge management
- Web-based applications
- Logistics
- Humanitarian assistance/disaster relief

=== Decommissioning and disposal ===
Late 2003 saw a see-saw change for the Coronado. In November the ship was decommissioned, transferred to the Military Sealift Command and redesignated T-AGF-11. However, it was concluded shortly thereafter that the operations the ship engaged in required it to be a warship and thus the vessel was transferred back to the Navy and recommissioned, but kept a large civilian complement within the crew from the MSC. In 2004, the 7th Fleet command ship, USS Blue Ridge, went into dry dock and Coronado temporarily assumed 7th Fleet command responsibilities. On 27 September 2004, Blue Ridge returned to duty as the command ship.

Coronado was decommissioned at the end of Fiscal Year 2006.

On 12 September 2012, the Coronado was sunk by a number of warships. The ship now rests 3,045 fathoms (18,270 ft; 5,569 m) deep at coordinates 11°32′6″N 144°31′52″E.
