= Austin-class amphibious transport dock =

Class of US amphibious transport docks

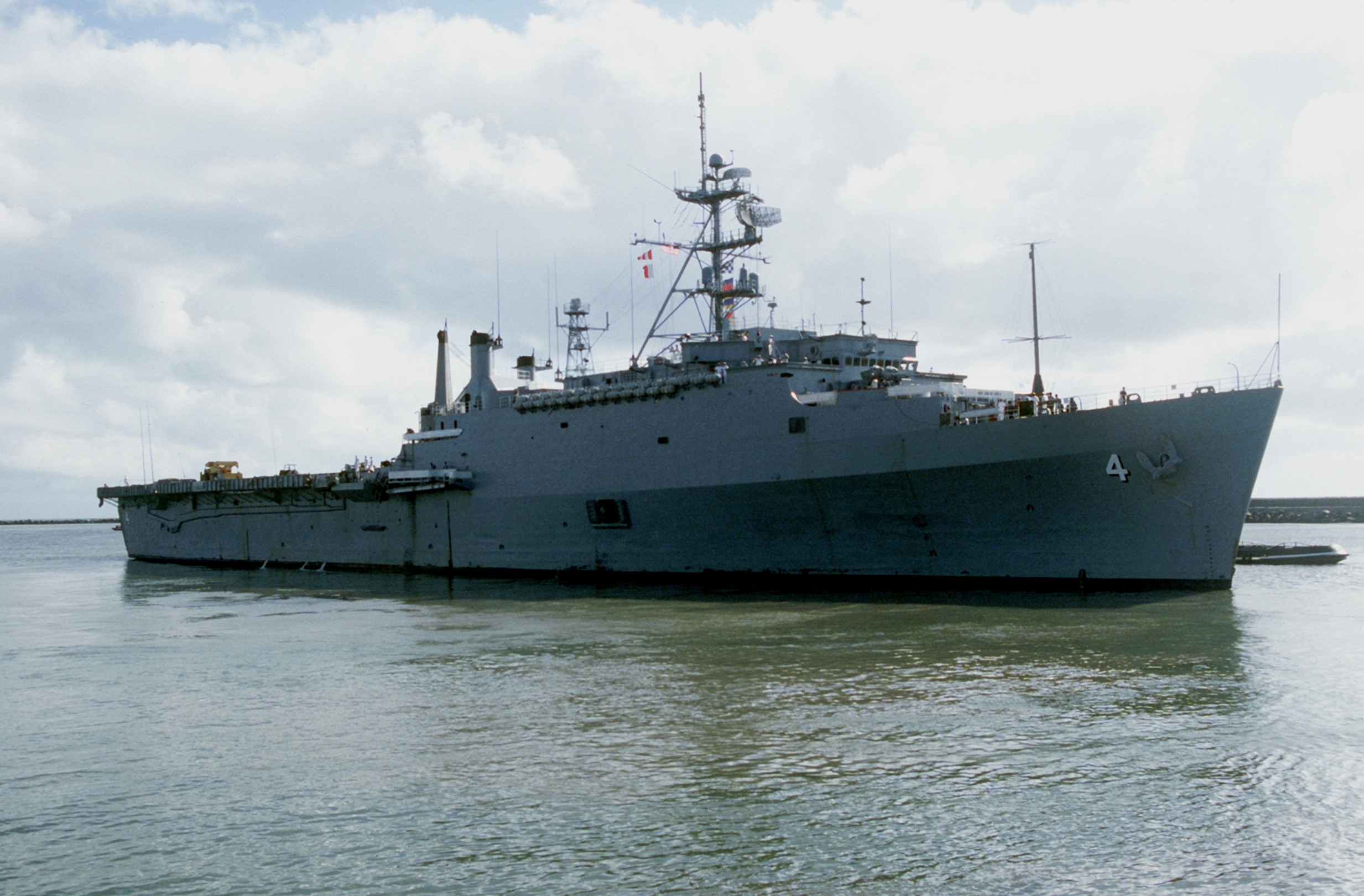
- USS Austin (LPD-4)

Class overview
- Name: Austin class
- Builders: New York Naval Shipyard, Ingalls, Lockheed
- Operators: United States Navy; Indian Navy
- Preceded by: Raleigh class
- Succeeded by: San Antonio class
- Cost: US$235–419 million per unit
- In commission: 1965–2017 (U.S.)
- Planned: 13
- Completed: 12
- Canceled: 1
- Active: 1 (with India)
- Retired: 11

General characteristics
- Type: Amphibious transport dock
- Tonnage: 7,713 DWT
- Displacement: 9,201 tons (light); 16,914 tons (full)
- Length: 548 ft (167 m)w/l; 569 ft (173 m) o/a
- Beam: 84 ft (26 m) w/l; 105 ft (32 m) extreme
- Draft: 22 ft (6.7 m) navigational, 34 ft (10 m) ballasted
- Propulsion: 2 × boilers, 2 × steam turbines, 2 × shafts, 24,000 shp (18,000 kW)
- Speed: 21 knots (24 mph; 39 km/h)
- Boats & landing craft carried: 1 × LCAC, or; 1 × LCU & 3 × LCM-6, or; 4 × LCM-8, or; 9 × LCM-6, or; 24 × AAV
- Complement: 24 officers, 396 enlisted, 900 marines
- Armament: 2 × 25 mm Mk 38 guns; 2 × Phalanx CIWS; 8 × .50-calibre machine guns
- Aircraft carried: Up to 6 CH-46 Sea Knight helicopters

The Austin class was a class of twelve amphibious transport dock ships in service with the United States Navy from 1965 to 2017. Note that the U.S. Naval Vessel Registry list separate Cleveland (seven built) and Trenton (two built) class ships, but most sources lists them as a single class. Trenton was sold to India and is the only ship still active.

== Design ==
The Austin class was an enlarged version of the preceding Raleigh class. Designed under project SCB 187B, the ships are about 47 ft (14 m) longer which increased the displacement by some 3,300 tons. The dock is as large as that of the Raleigh-class. In front of the dock was a 70m long raised level to park vehicles which was connected via a ramp to the flight deck. The ramp ended in a new telescoping hangar. Although the flight deck had room for up to six CH-46 Sea Knight helicopters, the hangar was only a temporary shelter for a single helicopter and not a permanent facility. The propulsion consists of two Foster Wheeler boilers (600 psi), powering two De Laval GT turbines, providing 12,000 SHP each for the two propellers.

The reason for creating a Cleveland/Trenton sub-class is that the last nine ships of the class were built as flagships for amphibious ready groups with an additional deck above the bridge and accommodations for additional 90 personnel. The SPS-40 radar is also placed higher on the mast. Otherwise the ships are identical. Originally the ships were armed only with four 3-inch/50-caliber gun Mark 33 twin mounts. These were later removed and the weapon stations were used to fit two Phalanx CIWS.

The last ship of the class, LPD-16, while authorized, was cancelled before being constructed. USS Coronado served for 10 years as an LPD before she was converted into a command ship. She kept her hull number and was redesignated AGF-11. From 2012 to 2017, USS Ponce served with the United States Military Sealift Command as a forward base ship with helicopter facilities, which was designated "Afloat Forward Staging Base, Interim".

== Ships ==
Ship	Hull no.	Builder	In service	Homeport	NVR page
Austin	LPD-4	New York Naval Shipyard	1965–2006	Norfolk, Virginia	LPD04
Ogden	LPD-5	New York Naval Shipyard	1965–2007	San Diego, California	LPD05
Duluth	LPD-6	New York Naval Shipyard	1965–2005	San Diego, California	LPD06
Cleveland sub-class
Cleveland	LPD-7	Ingalls Shipbuilding	1967–2011	San Diego, California	LPD07
Dubuque	LPD-8	Ingalls Shipbuilding	1967–2011	San Diego, California	LPD08
Denver	LPD-9	Lockheed Shipbuilding	1968–2014	Sasebo, Japan	LPD09
Juneau	LPD-10	Lockheed Shipbuilding	1969–2008	Sasebo, Japan	LPD10
Coronado	LPD-11/ AGF-11	Lockheed Shipbuilding	1970–2005	San Diego, California	AGF11
Shreveport	LPD-12	Lockheed Shipbuilding	1970–2007	Norfolk, Virginia	LPD12
Nashville	LPD-13	Lockheed Shipbuilding	1970–2009	Norfolk, Virginia	LPD13
Trenton sub-class
Trenton	LPD-14	Lockheed Shipbuilding	1971–2007, 2007–present	Norfolk, Virginia	LPD14
Ponce	LPD-15/ AFSB(I)-15	Lockheed Shipbuilding	1971–2017	Norfolk, Virginia	LPD15
