= USS Austin (LPD-4) =

Amphibious transport dock ship, 1964–2006

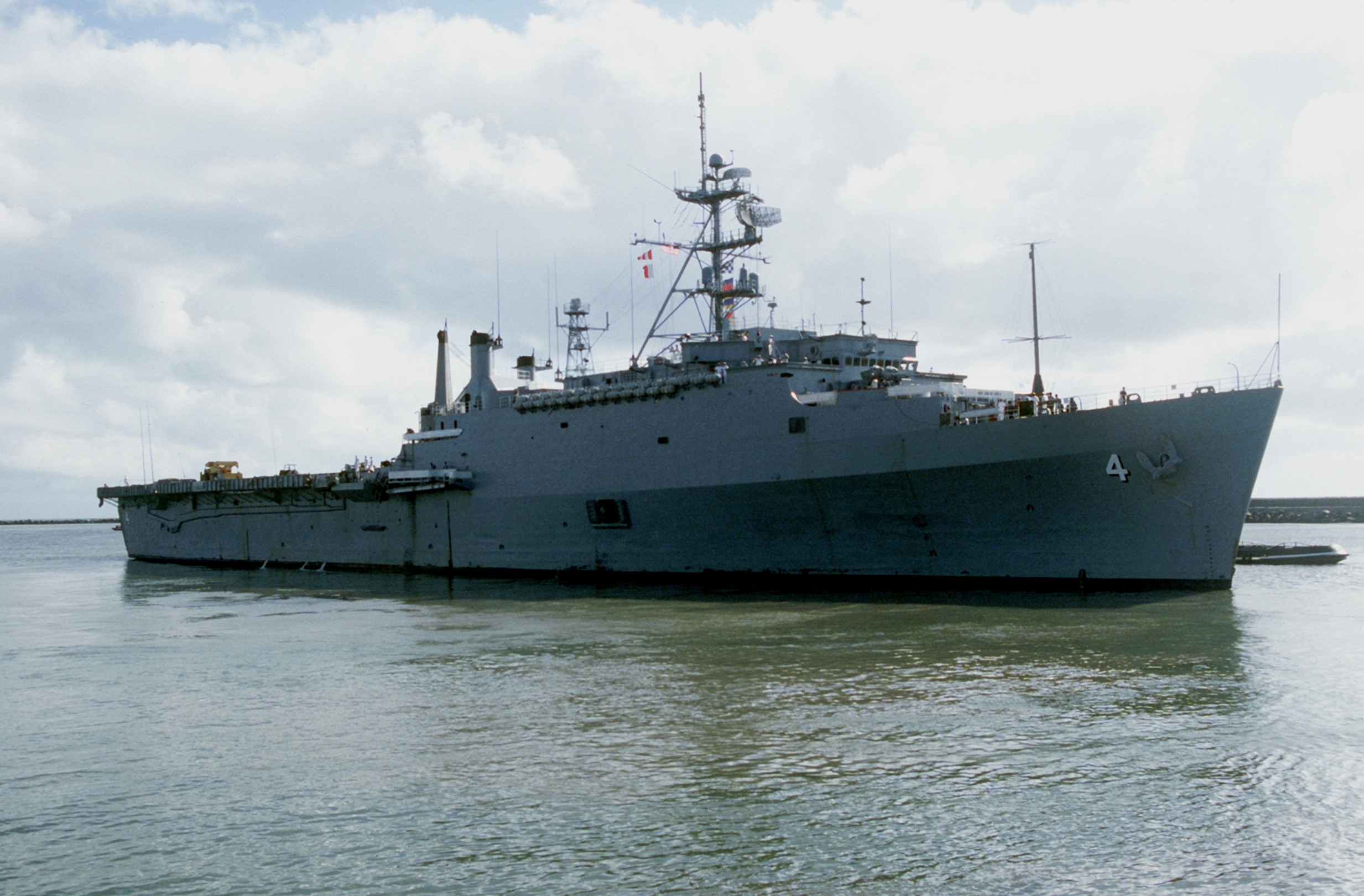
- USS Austin (LPD-4) underway in 1982

History

United States
- Name: Austin
- Ordered: 21 September 1961
- Laid down: 4 February 1963
- Launched: 27 June 1964
- Commissioned: 6 February 1965
- Decommissioned: 27 September 2006
- Stricken: 27 September 2006
- Identification: Hull number: LPD-4
- Motto: Potestas Maritimas per Mobilitate, "Seapower through Mobility"
- Fate: Sold for scrapping 30 September 2009

General characteristics
- Class & type: Austin-class amphibious transport dock
- Tonnage: 7408 tons deadweight
- Displacement: 9962 tons light, 17370 tons full
- Length: 569 ft (173 m) overall; 548 ft (167 m) waterline
- Beam: 108 ft (33 m) extreme; 84 ft (26 m) waterline
- Draft: 22 ft (6.7 m) maximum; 23 ft (7.0 m) limit
- Speed: 21 knots (39 km/h; 24 mph)
- Capacity: 930 troops
- Complement: 24 officers, 396 enlisted
- Armament: eight 3 in (76 mm) guns

The third USS Austin (LPD-4) was the lead ship of her class of amphibious transport dock ships in the United States Navy. Austin was named in honor of the city of Austin, Texas which in turn was named in honor of Stephen F. Austin, a Texian patriot during the Texas War for Independence and the first Secretary of State of the Republic of Texas.

Austin was laid down on 4 February 1963 at Brooklyn, New York, by the New York Naval Shipyard. She was launched on 27 June 1964 (sponsored by Miss Lynda Bird Johnson, the daughter of President of the United States Lyndon B. Johnson), and commissioned on 6 February 1965.

== 1960s ==
The amphibious transport dock remained at Brooklyn through May, then sailed to Norfolk, Virginia, on 26 May to complete her outfitting. During September and October, she was engaged in shakedown training in the vicinity of Guantanamo Bay Naval Base, Cuba. The ship then made a port call at Corpus Christi, Texas, before returning to her home port of Norfolk in November.

From November 1965 through April 1966, Austin operated in the Norfolk area before entering the Philadelphia Naval Shipyard on 5 May for repairs and alterations. When this work was completed, she headed for the Caribbean to conduct two weeks of trials off Vieques Island, Puerto Rico. The ship next sailed to the Dominican Republic to assist in the withdrawal of units of the Inter-American Peace Force which had helped restore stability during a political crisis. These units were disembarked at Sunny Point, North Carolina, on 9 August, and she then returned, via Norfolk, to Philadelphia, Pennsylvania, where she arrived on 21 August for adjustments to her main propulsion plant. On 3 November Austin returned to Norfolk.

She spent the next four and one-half months in preparation for an extended deployment as a unit of the Caribbean Amphibious Ready Group. On 15 April 1967, Austin touched at Morehead City, North Carolina, to embark United States Marine Corps units and then proceeded to the Caribbean. While there, she participated in numerous amphibious training exercises and made port visits at Ponce, Puerto Rico, and San Juan, Puerto Rico, Willemstad, Netherlands Antilles, St. Thomas, Virgin Islands, Colón, Panama, and Guantánamo Bay. The vessel returned her marines to Morehead City on 17 August and arrived at Norfolk on 19 August for a leave and upkeep period. She got underway again on 4 November to become a part of the recovery force for the Apollo 4 space mission. From 13 to 16 November, Austin held amphibious training exercises, then returned to Norfolk for the holidays.

She sailed on 8 January 1968 to carry naval personnel and equipment to Key West, Florida. After continuing on to Roosevelt Roads, Puerto Rico, the ship arrived back in Norfolk 25 January. During February, March, and April, she took part in several training exercises along the east coast. On 13 May, another cruise to the Caribbean began which included visits to Bermuda, Nassau, Bahamas, San Juan, Puerto Rico, and Key West, Florida. The vessel briefly returned to Norfolk on 3 June and then retraced her route to take part in Operation Race Run at Vieques Island. Austin was back in home port on 30 June and entered the Norfolk Naval Shipyard on 19 July for an overhaul.

Refresher training at Guantánamo Bay in late January 1969 was followed by two weeks of amphibious warfare training in the Virginia Capes area. In April, Austin took part in special amphibious exercises before beginning another deployment to the Caribbean on 18 May. During the four-month cruise, she was involved in Operation Exotic Dancer II, held off Puerto Rico and visits included San Juan and Roosevelt Roads, La Guaira, Venezuela; Colón, Panama; Guantánamo Bay; Bridgetown, Barbados; and St. Thomas. This deployment ended on 10 September, and the ship began a period of leave and upkeep at Norfolk. She sailed again on 4 November as a recovery ship in support of the Apollo 12 spaceshot and remained on station until 24 November when she began the voyage back to Norfolk. Austin made a brief stop at Port of Spain, Trinidad, on 29–30 November and arrived at Norfolk on 6 December.

== 1970s ==
Austin spent the first two and one-half months of 1970 in port, before sailing on 17 March with Amphibious Squadron (PhibRon) 2 for the Mediterranean. The deployment included amphibious landing exercises and stops at Rota, Spain, and Málaga, Spain, Genoa, Italy, and Naples, Italy, Cannes, France, and Valletta, Malta. Austin lost her stern gate on 6 June, and temporary repairs were made at Malta from 16 to 30 June. The ship arrived back in Norfolk on 13 July to begin a yard period for permanent repairs. She emerged from the shipyard on 22 September and began refresher training. Austin again deployed with PhibRon 2 on 16 November. During the cruise, Austin held numerous amphibious and antisubmarine warfare exercises. She also visited Genoa, Livorno, and Naples, Italy, Barcelona and Rota, Spain, Mersin, Turkey, and Athens, Greece. On 7 May 1971, Austin ended the cruise at Norfolk.

The ship got underway again on 14 July for operations in conjunction with the recovery of the Apollo 15 space capsule.

The first two weeks in August were spent in naval mine countermeasures exercises held in the area of Charleston, South Carolina. Austin then entered a period of type training and amphibious exercises followed by more mine warfare exercises in early November. She returned to Norfolk on 12 November for the holidays.

Austin began 1972 with Exercise Snowy Beach, a large-scale landing exercise held off the coast of Maine. From 15 February to 20 March, she participated in Operation Springboard in the Caribbean. The ship visited the United States Naval Academy from 17 to 20 April to hold indoctrination tours for midshipmen. During the next two months, she conducted type training and took part in Exercises "Exotic Dancer", and "Escort Tiger." On 5 July, the vessel unloaded all ammunition in preparation for overhaul. She entered the Maryland Shipbuilding and Drydock Company of Baltimore, Maryland, on 11 July. Work continued there until 11 October, when she was towed to the Norfolk Naval Shipyard for completion of the yard work.

On 15 March 1973, Austin began post-repair trials. She sailed to Guantánamo Bay on 22 March and, after refresher training, returned to Norfolk 24 April. After another two months of preparation, the vessel sailed on 7 June for another Mediterranean deployment. Her ports of call included Alicante, Barcelona, and Rota, Spain; Trieste and Venice, Italy, and Corfu, Athens, and Rhodes, Greece. She took part in several exercises, including NATO Exercise "Deep Furrow", from 18 September to 4 October. On 10 October, Austin got underway for Souda Bay, Crete, as a part of the Sixth Fleet response to the Yom Kippur War. In early December, she began the trip back to Norfolk. After pausing briefly at Morehead City on 19 December, she arrived at Norfolk the next day for post-deployment standdown.

The ship got underway on 8 February 1974 for Guantánamo Bay as a unit of the Caribbean Amphibious Ready Group. She operated from various points in Puerto Rico and the Virgin Islands through August. In early September, Austin visited Caracas, Venezuela, and Willemstad, Netherlands Antilles. While in Curaçao, 154 Dutch marines were embarked for Exercise "Doria Salute VII." The marines disembarked at Vieques Island; then Austin returned to Norfolk (via San Juan, Aruba, and Curaçao) on 19 March. However, she headed back toward the Caribbean on 24 April. The first country visited was Panama, where marines disembarked for jungle warfare training. Her subsequent ports of call included Cartagena, Colombia, Vieques, Puerto Rico, and St. John's, Antigua and Barbuda. From 25 May to 2 June, Austin was back in Norfolk for upkeep. She resumed duty on 30 October by sailing to the Canal Zone. The ship continued her routine of shuttling marines and their equipment between various Caribbean ports through 16 December, when she arrived back at Norfolk.

On 25 February 1975, Austin deployed once more to the Mediterranean and carried out amphibious training exercises and midshipmen training cruises in that area, visiting ports in Spain, Italy, and France before returning to Norfolk on 20 August. She then began an extended period of availability.

The ship got underway on 14 January 1976 to load ammunition and sailed a week later for the Caribbean. After a brief training period at Guantánamo Bay, she continued on to Curaçao. From 4–16 February, Austin took part in Exercise "Rum Punch 76". She was back in home port on 21 February for upkeep.

For the next four months, the amphibious transport dock was involved in a series of inspections, training exercises, and Naval Reserve training cruises. On 9 June, she returned briefly to the Caribbean and then made a short visit to New York City in early July. Austin was back in Norfolk on 10 July and began preparations for overseas movement. She sailed on 20 August for northern Europe. Her ports of call during the cruise included Ørland, Norway; Edinburgh, Scotland; Scapa Flow, Orkney Islands; Esbjerg, Denmark; Amsterdam, Netherlands; Bremerhaven, Germany, and Portsmouth, England. After a stop at Morehead City to disembark marines she arrived in Norfolk on 11 November.

The ship went to Yorktown, Virginia, on 17 January 1977 to unload ammunition prior to her scheduled overhaul. She proceeded to Baltimore on 2 February and commenced overhaul at the Maryland Shipbuilding and Drydock Company. The work was finished on 16 February 1978, and Austin returned the next day to Norfolk. After a brief stay, she sailed to Guantánamo Bay for refresher training, but was back in Norfolk on 25 April. After several months of training, the vessel got underway 22 August for the north Atlantic. There she took part in Operation Northern Wedding, in conjunction with other NATO naval units, and made stops in Norway, Denmark, and England, before returning to Norfolk 31 October.

== 1980s ==
Austin sailed on 30 January 1980 for another Mediterranean deployment. On her first stop during this trip, she supported USMC and Portuguese Fuzileiros combined arms operations. Next, she made a port call in Lisbon, and a supply stop in Rota, Spain. After leaving Rota and passing through the Straits of Gibraltar, at approximately 0125, with the C.O. resting in his stateroom, she plowed into a large container ship thirty miles off the coast of Spain, avoiding capsizing and all-hands-lost by mere seconds. She limped into Cartagena Spain. The marines (3/8) on board were moved to the other ships in the fleet, and Austin cruised to Athens, Greece for repairs. Once repaired, the ship stopped in Naples, Genoa, and Venice, Italy. The ship returned to her home port on 11 July. After a brief respite, she sailed for South America on 15 October and participated in Operation Unites, and Operation Allied Caribe 80. The warship took part in an amphibious operation with Brazilian naval forces. Operation Allied Caribe 80 was held in the Antilles in conjunction with units from the United Kingdom, Canada and the Netherlands. Austin later provided hurricane relief assistance to the inhabitants of Dominica. The ship returned to Norfolk 7 December, and she continued operations from that port into 1981.

On 3 February 1981, Austin put to sea from Norfolk on her way to Morehead City to embark Marine Corps units. From Morehead City, she headed for the Arctic Circle near Norway where she participated in cold weather training. The warship returned to Norfolk on 17 April and resumed normal operations out of that port. Late in June, she voyaged south and west to the gulf coast of Florida to perform a special project for the Chief of Naval Operations. During the trip home, Austin visited Fort Lauderdale, Florida, and Nassau, Bahamas. Arriving back at Norfolk on 8 July, she resumed a normal schedule of operations until the beginning of September when she entered the yard at the Norfolk Shipbuilding and Drydock Company to begin an 11-month overhaul.

Austin completed the repair period on 2 August 1982 and spent most of the remainder of the year undergoing post-overhaul inspections and examinations at Norfolk. She began 1983 with a cruise to Guantánamo Bay, Cuba, to conduct post-overhaul refresher training. During the early part of February, the warship took an extended break from training to make a 12-day port visit to New Orleans, Louisiana, for the Mardi Gras festival. Austin resumed refresher training on 19 February and concluded it 1 March. In March and early April, she operated out of Norfolk and then spent the last three weeks of April in port preparing to deploy to the troubled eastern Mediterranean. On 5 May Austin set sail for Morehead City where she embarked the 1st Battalion, 8th Marines (BLT 1/8), and the 24th Marine Amphibious Unit (MAU 24) before heading out across the Atlantic.

The warship arrived in the Mediterranean late in May and disembarked the Marine Corps units at Beirut, Lebanon, where a guerilla-style civil war among a virtual rainbow of factions complicated by military incursions on the parts of Syria and Israel, had been in progress at varying levels of intensity for some time. In September 1982, the assassination of President-elect Bachir Gemayel touched off atrocities that brought a multinational peacekeeping force into the country soon thereafter. In May 1983, the marines of BLT 1/8 and MAU 24 replaced the part of that force protecting Beirut International Airport. Austin, for her part, remained in the vicinity providing support for the troops, anchoring nearby during the day and steaming out to sea at night.

As tense as the situation in Lebanon was, ship and marines quickly settled into a routine. Too quickly perhaps, for on 23 October 1983, a terrorist shattered that routine when he drove an explosives-laden truck into the lobby of the headquarters of the Marine Corps units stationed ashore. The detonation of the mobile bomb destroyed the headquarters, killed 241 men and injured over 100 others. Austin responded to the emergency quickly by providing men to stand security watches and help in the search for survivors. In November, the amphibious transport dock departed the eastern Mediterranean and began the voyage home. On 7 December, she disembarked the remnants of BLT 1/8 and MAU 24 at Morehead City. The following day Austin put into port at Little Creek, Virginia, and began post-deployment leave and upkeep.

The warship remained in port at Little Creek for the first six weeks of 1984. On 13 February, she put to sea to participate in a minesweeping exercise off the coast of North Carolina before heading for Scandinavian waters. During the Atlantic transit and during her time in the Arctic waters near Norway, Austin and other Navy warships joined elements of the navies of Canada, Denmark, Norway, and the United Kingdom in conducting the two-part NATO Exercise "United Effort Teamwork '84."

Following the conclusion of the exercise, the amphibious transport dock made ceremonial visits to ports in Norway, the Netherlands, and in the United Kingdom. She returned to Little Creek on 28 April after a brief stop at Morehead City to disembark marines and unload their equipment.

In June, at the conclusion of the usual post-deployment stand down, Austin embarked upon a schedule of normal operations along the east coast. That employment occupied her time for the remainder of 1984 and during the first half of 1985. On 2 July 1985, she made the brief voyage to Morehead City where she embarked Marine Corps units and their equipment for another tour of duty with the Sixth Fleet. The amphibious transport dock arrived in Rota, Spain, on 13 July and entered the Mediterranean Sea the following day. While the problems in Lebanon continued, direct American military involvement there had ceased. The Austin was involved in the hijacking of the Achilles Lauro Italian cruise ship..did 45 days underway, Thus Austin accomplished her 1985 Mediterranean deployment in a more routine fashion. It consisted of bilateral and multilateral exercises punctuated by visits to ports throughout the Mediterranean. She completed turnover procedures at Rota, Spain, 4–7 December and then put to sea for the voyage home. Austin stopped at Morehead City on 18–19 December to disembark marines and stood into Norfolk on 20 December.

In January 1986, the amphibious transport dock began a restricted availability at pierside in Norfolk. She finished repairs late in April and resumed normal operations out of Norfolk. Austin pursued those activities until the middle of August. She departed Norfolk 12 August and, after embarking Marine Corps units at Morehead City the next day, set sail for northern Europe and another series of exercises with forces of other NATO nations. The cruise – highlighted by visits to Germany, and England – lasted through the first week in October. On 8 October, Austin stood out of Dover, England, and sailed back to the United States.

In September 1987, Austin was part of LF6F 1-89/22d MEU (HMM-162, BLT 318, and MSSG-22). The group was part of a Mediterranean deployment. Austin embarked elements of 3d Battalion, 8th Marines from Camp Lejeune (primarily Kilo Company) at Morehead City on 29 September 1987. Austin and 22d MEU participated in Operations Sierra de Retin, Phinia 89, Noble Shirley, and the NATO exercise Dragon Hammer in Sardinia, returning to Morehead City 18 March 1988. The Austin visited Rota and Cartagena, Spain, Marseille and Toulon, France, Naples, Italy, Antalya, Turkey, and Haifa, Israel.

== 1990s ==
The Austin played an important role during the Iraqi War. In late 1990 Austin was undergoing maintenance, which was stopped short due to the impending Gulf War and the Austin redeployed. In January 1991 inchoped in Rota for turnover with USS Nashville and proceeded into the Mediterranean. While there, Austin conducted exercises with other countries before the call came to support Operation Provide Comfort. Austin, USS Guadalcanal and USS Charleston all assisted in this mission with one port of call for liberty in Haifa, Israel. The MARG (Marine Amphibious Readiness Group) was extended by two weeks while they waited to back load Marines who were in northern Iraq. On 7 August 1991, Austin pulled into Morehead City to offload Marines, and returned to Norfolk on 8 August for post deployment stand down. In November, Austin entered Metro Machine for dry dock repairs and maintenance. In April 1992, Austin returned to Norfolk to finish repairs and prepare for subsequent work ups and prepared to redeploy in 1993.

In late October 1990 the USS Austin supported Marines in Operation Sharp Edge, the non-combatant evacuation and defense of the US Embassy in Monrovia, Liberia. In January 1991 the Austin returned to the Mediterranean.

In late 1994 she was given a refit after returning form the Mediterranean and was assigned to Operations Safe Haven and Safe Passage. The ship was too wide to traverse the Panama Canal. In the early part of 1995 the Austin went to Guantanamo to begin service to that mission. She was on the mission for 30 days before returning to Norfolk, Virginia.

== 2000s ==
In 2002–2003 Austin deployed to the Mediterranean in support of operations in Kosovo, as well as providing support to marines as they deployed to Kenya for humanitarian aid operations and Djibouti as the marines provided security for Predator UAV airbases. They then deployed to the Persian Gulf in support of Operation Enduring Freedom and Operation Iraqi Freedom.

In May 2005, Austin set sail from Naval Base Norfolk. to Port-au-Prince, Haiti in order to pick up National Guard and Army Corps of Engineers troops who were responsible for providing humanitarian aid and completing numerous public works projects in and around the city of Port-au-Prince. After roughly a week anchored off the coast of Haiti, the Austin set sail for Guantánamo Bay (GITMO), Cuba. After about a week at Guantánamo Bay, Austin set sail for St. Thomas, Virgin Islands. After nearly a month away from her homeport in Norfolk, Virginia, the Austin and her crew returned home. Austin's final deployment was from November 2005 – May 2006. Austin transported Marines to the Persian Gulf and provided support during Operation Iraqi Freedom.

== Decommissioning ==
Austin was decommissioned at Naval Station Norfolk on 27 September 2006. After the ceremonies, she was taken in tow by USS Grasp to be taken to the Naval Inactive Ship Maintenance Facility at Philadelphia, Pennsylvania. On 30 September 2009, a contract to dismantle Austin was issued to International Shipbreaking Ltd, Brownsville, Texas, where scrapping was completed on 10 September 2010. The anchor and bell of Austin is now on display at the Brooklyn Navy Yard, in the Building 92 visitor center which includes a museum about the Yard's history.

== Sources ==
- nvr.navy.mil: USS Austin
