= USS Juneau (LPD-10) =

Amphibious transport dock of the United States Navy

Coordinates: 21.3760943°N 157.9877161°W

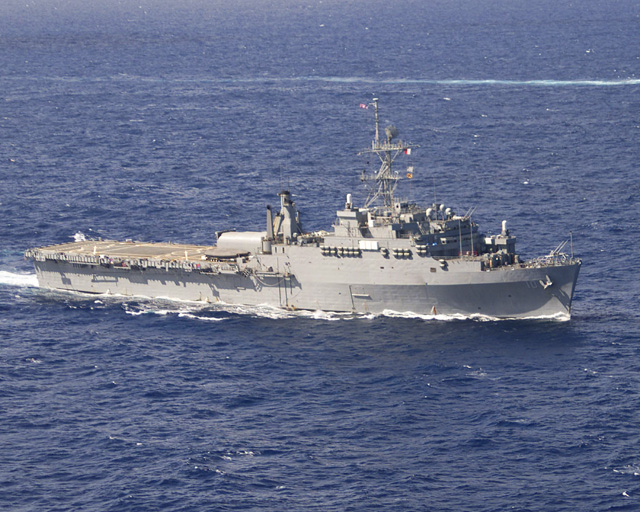
- USS Juneau (LPD-10)

History

United States
- Name: Juneau
- Namesake: City of Juneau, Alaska
- Ordered: 23 May 1963
- Laid down: 23 January 1965
- Launched: 12 February 1966
- Sponsored by: Mrs. William A. Egan
- Commissioned: 12 July 1969
- Decommissioned: 30 October 2008
- Stricken: 13 November 2017
- Identification: Hull number: LPD-10
- Nickname(s): The Mighty "J", "The Perfect 10", "The Jolly J"
- Status: Sunk as a target as part of Exercise Valiant Shield, 26 June 2026
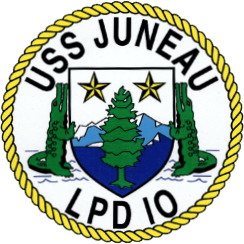
- Badge

General characteristics
- Class & type: Austin-class amphibious transport dock
- Displacement: 17,299 long tons (17,577 t) full load, 9,589 long tons (9,743 t) tons light, 7,710 long tons (7,830 t) deadweight tonnage
- Length: 173.7 m (570 ft) overall, 167 m (548 ft) waterline
- Beam: 30.4 m (100 ft) extreme, 25.6 m (84 ft) waterline
- Draft: 6.7 m (22 ft) maximum, 7 m (23 ft) limit
- Speed: 21 knots (39 km/h; 24 mph)
- Troops: 930 Marines
- Complement: 35 officers, 400 sailors
- Armament: 8 × .50-caliber machine guns, 2 × 25 mm cannons, 2 × CIWS mounts
- Aircraft carried: Up to six CH-46 Sea Knight helicopters

USS Juneau (LPD-10), an Austin-class amphibious transport dock, was the third ship of the United States Navy to be named for the capital of Alaska. The ship entered service on 12 July 1969, and participated in the Vietnam War, was command ship for the response to the Exxon Valdez oil spill, transported troops to the Persian Gulf for Operation Desert Storm, and was part of the attempted US response to Cyclone Nargis. Juneau was decommissioned in 2008, and was sunk as a target as part of Exercise Valiant Shield on 26 June 2026.

== Construction and launch ==
Her keel was laid down by Lockheed Shipbuilding and Construction Company of Seattle, Washington, on 23 January 1965. She was launched on 12 February 1966 (sponsored by Mrs. Neva Egan, wife of William A. Egan, the Governor of Alaska), and commissioned on 12 July 1969.

== Operational history ==
Throughout the 1970s, Juneau completed five deployments to the western Pacific, including eight trips into Vietnamese waters, earning five battle stars for its efforts in the Vietnam War. Juneau conducted the first AV-8A Harrier landing on a United States Pacific Fleet LPD in February 1976. On 4 July 1976, Juneau arrived in Juneau, Alaska with a complement of Marines from 1st Battalion, 5th Marines, 1st Marine Division as part of United States Bicentennial celebrations.

During the 1980s Juneau completed seven deployments. In April 1989, Juneau received emergency orders to Prince William Sound in support of the Exxon Valdez oil spill clean up. She was the first naval vessel on station, and assumed the duties of command and control ship for Joint Task Force Alaska. She provided berthing, communications, transportation (both surface and air), food, medical and laundry services for over four hundred civilian cleanup workers. She was the host of Vice-president Dan Quayle's visit to Prince William Sound, where he toured an oil soaked beach and then returned to Juneau and gave a speech that was televised nationwide.

After the Iraqi invasion of Kuwait and the initiation of Operation Desert Shield, Juneau sailed with twelve other ships of Amphibious Group Three in December 1990 to participate in Operation Desert Storm. Joining with ships from Amphibious Group Two, Juneau was a member of the largest amphibious task force since the United Nations assault on Incheon, South Korea in the Korean War. On 24 February 1991 Juneau off-loaded her equipment and ammunition in record time and landed her embarked troops at Ras Mishab, Saudi Arabia, whence they would assault Iraqi positions in southern Kuwait.

In May 1991, Juneau proceeded to Bangladesh to assist in Operation Sea Angel, providing relief after a disastrous cyclone.

During her 14th deployment in late 1992, Juneau was diverted to the coast of Somalia in support of Operation Restore Hope. Early on 9 December 1992, the 15th Marine Expeditionary Unit (MEU) performed an unopposed amphibious assault into the city of Mogadishu from Juneau, USS Tripoli and USS Rushmore. The embarked Marines ensured the security of shipments of food supplies to the people of Somalia.

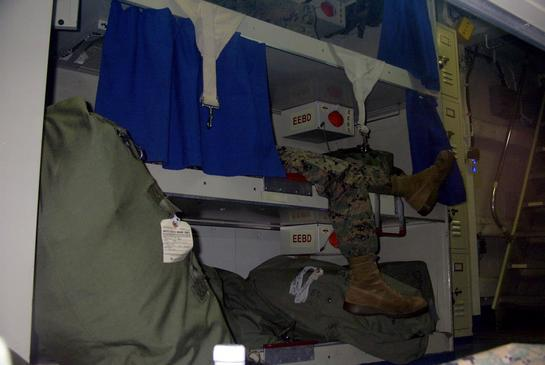
USMC berthing area on board the Mighty "J" circa 2004.

Juneau was homeported in San Diego until 30 July 1999 when she relieved USS Dubuque as part of the forward-deployed naval forces. From June to September 1999 Juneau participated in the first ship swap with her sister ship Dubuque, where each ship's crew remained in their original home ports, allowing Dubuque to return to the homeport of San Diego, California. Since that date, Juneau has been homeported in Sasebo, Japan.

Juneau was deployed to East Timor as part of the Australian-led INTERFET peacekeeping taskforce from 28 to 31 January 2000.

During the 2008 Myanmar Cyclone Nargis crisis and the subsequent Operation Caring Response aid mission, Juneau (as part of the USS Essex amphibious group, along with USS Harpers Ferry, and USS Mustin), she stood by off Burma from 13 May to 5 June, waiting for the Myanmar junta government to permit US aid to its citizens. However, in early June, with permission still not forthcoming, it was decided to put the group back on its scheduled operations.

== Decommissioning ==
Juneau swapped with her sister ship USS Denver during the third quarter of fiscal year 2008. After the swap, the ship sailed to San Diego for decommissioning. The decommissioning took place 30 October 2008 after which the ship was moved to Hawaii and placed in the National Defense Reserve Fleet. On 26 or 27 June, 2026, Juneau was sunk as a target by multinational forces during Exercise Valiant Shield in the Pacific Ocean about 200 nautical miles off the coast of Guam. A Royal New Zealand Air Force P-8A Poseidon fired two AGM-84D Harpoon missiles and a B-2 Spirit bomber launched a Long Range Anti-Ship Missile, or LRASM, then she was torpedoed and sunk by a Japanese submarine.
