= USS Dubuque (LPD-8) =

Austin-class amphibious transport dock

Coordinates: 47.5527306°N 122.6523807°W

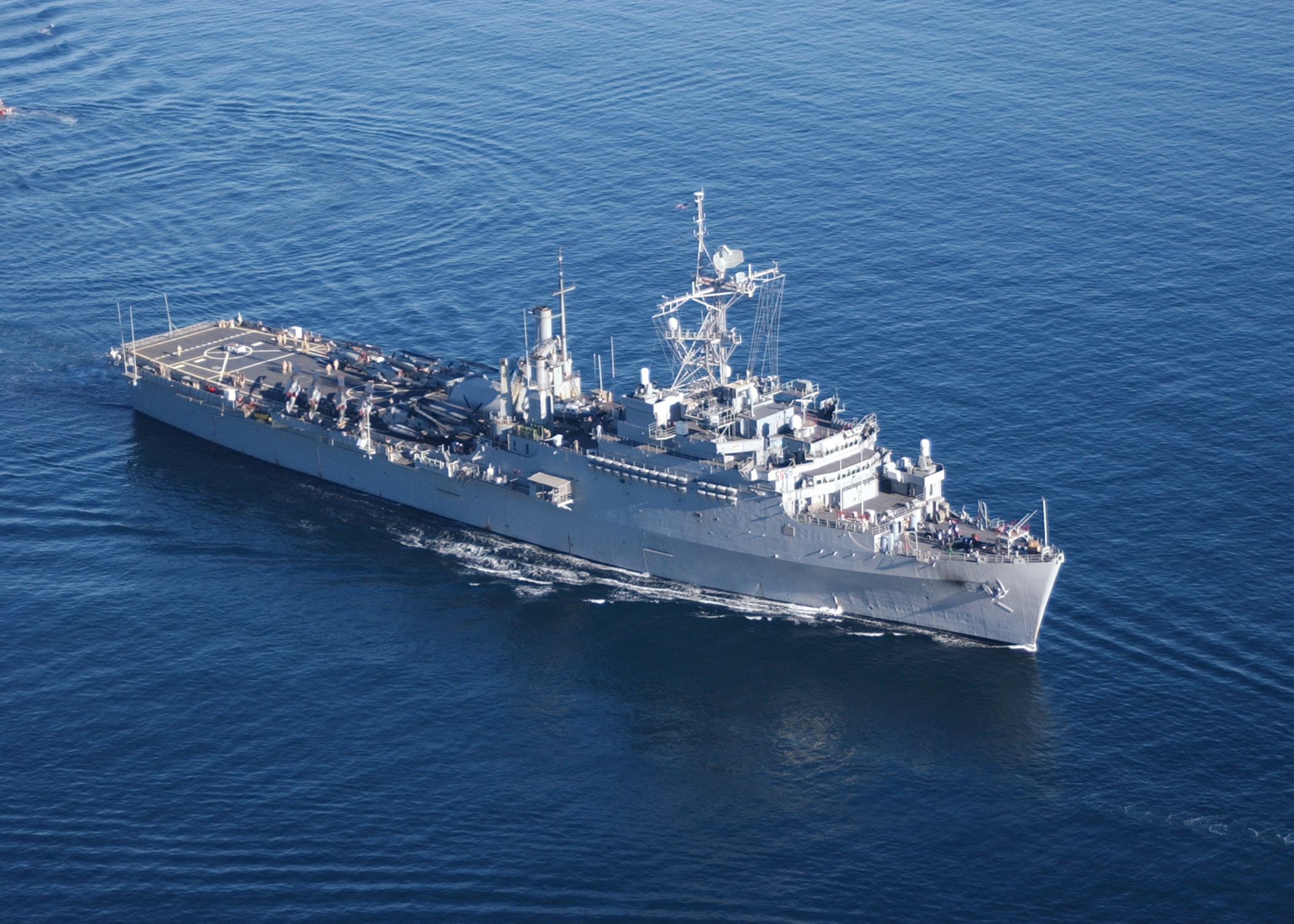
- Dubuque in 2003

History

United States
- Name: Dubuque
- Namesake: the city of Dubuque, Iowa
- Ordered: 25 January 1963
- Builder: Ingalls Shipbuilding
- Laid down: 25 January 1965
- Launched: 6 August 1966
- Commissioned: 1 September 1967
- Decommissioned: 30 June 2011
- Stricken: 13 November 2017
- Identification: Hull number: LPD-8
- Motto: Our Country: Heritage, and Future
- Nickname(s): The Mighty 8
- Honors and awards: Navy Unit Commendation (2); Meritorious Unit Commendation (3); Battle Efficiency Award (3); Vietnam Gallantry Cross Unit Citation
- Fate: Sunk as target, 11 July 2024
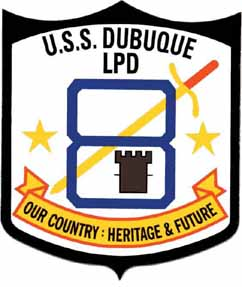
- Badge: Seal of Dubuque

General characteristics
- Class & type: Austin-class amphibious transport dock
- Displacement: 17,252 long tons (17,529 t) light; 9,521 long tons (9,674 t) full; 7,731 long tons (7,855 t) dwt
- Length: 569 ft (173 m) overall; 548 ft (167 m) waterline
- Beam: 100 ft (30 m) extreme; 84 ft (26 m) waterline
- Draft: 23 ft (7.0 m) maximum
- Decks: well deck 7,000 ft^{2} (650 m^{2})
- Ramps: 2
- Installed power: 24,000 per shaft (2 shafts)
- Propulsion: Two 600 psi (4,100 kPa) Foster-Wheeler boilers, two Delaval steam turbines, two shafts
- Speed: 21 knots (39 km/h; 24 mph)
- Boats & landing craft carried: 2 RHIB
- Capacity: cargo capacity 2,500 tons
- Complement: 24 officers, 396 enlisted, 840 marine troops, 90 flag/staff personnel
- Armament: 2 × 25 mm Mk 38 chain guns; 2 × 20 mm Mk 15 Phalanx CIWS; 8 × .50-caliber machine guns
- Aircraft carried: Two CH-46/CH-53 equivalents, or four UH-1/AH-1 equivalents, or two AV-8B Harriers
- Aviation facilities: 1 hangar

USS Dubuque (LPD-8) was an Austin-class amphibious transport dock of the United States Navy.

USS Dubuque was the second ship named after Dubuque, Iowa on the Mississippi River and her founder, Julien Dubuque - a French Canadian explorer. USS Dubuque was commissioned on 1 September 1967 at Norfolk Naval Shipyard in Portsmouth, Virginia.

== History ==
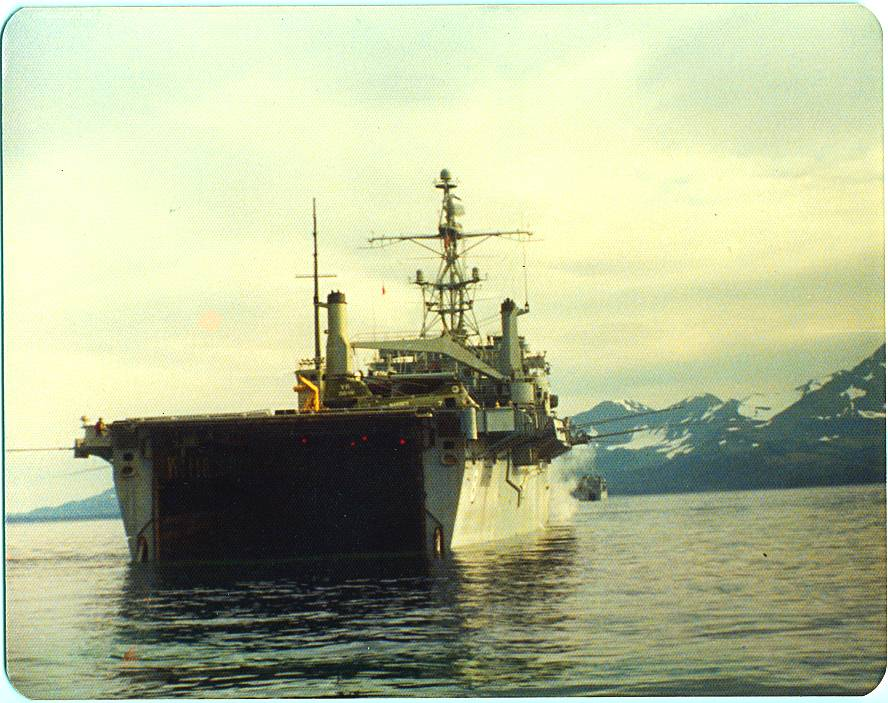
Stern view of USS Dubuque (LPD-8) off the Alaska coast in the 1970s. A CH-46 Sea Knight helicopter (probably of HMM-165) is visible on the deck.

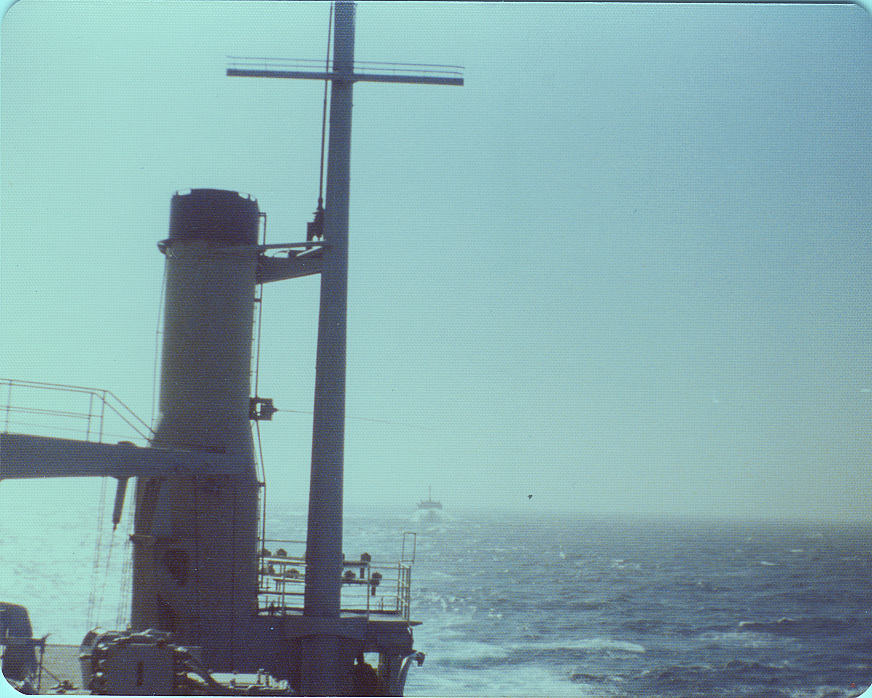
View from the starboard deck of the USS Dubuque, facing the stern. USS Racine (LST-1191) is visible in the far distance.

Dubuque's keel was laid down on 25 January 1965 by Ingalls Shipbuilding in Pascagoula, Mississippi. She was launched on 6 August 1966 and commissioned on 1 September 1967 at Norfolk Naval Shipyard in Portsmouth, Virginia. In November 1967, the ship arrived at her first homeport of San Diego, California after transiting the Panama Canal.

From 1968 until 1975, She made five Western Pacific deployments that saw extensive duty in Vietnam. In a highly publicized event in October 1968, the ship returned 14 repatriated prisoners of war (POWs) to North Vietnam. From 1969 until 1971 the ship conducted ten Operation Keystone Cardinal troop lifts to Okinawa as part of the withdrawal of US forces. Dubuque relieved USS Cleveland as the launch platform for HMA-369's Marine Hunter-Killer (MARHUK) Operations near Hon La (Tiger Island) off the coast of North Vietnam. From February to June 1973 the ship operated helicopters that conducted naval mine clearance operations in Haiphong Harbor as part of Operation End Sweep. In April 1975 the ship participated in Operation Frequent Wind, the evacuation of Saigon and the rescue of refugees fleeing South Vietnam.

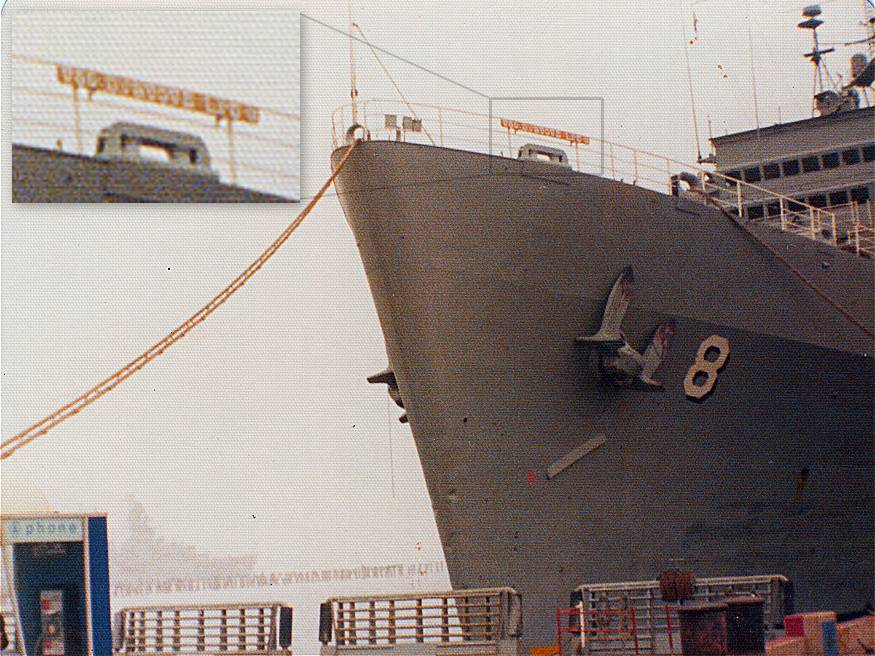
USS Dubuque (LPD-8) at pier in 1970s before transiting through Alaska, Subic Bay, and Okinawa

On 15 August 1985 Dubuque departed San Diego for her new homeport of Sasebo, Japan, where she arrived 4 September 1985. There, she joined the Seventh Fleet Overseas Family Residency Program, her primary mission to support the Marine Corps in the Western Pacific.

On 10 June 1988, they sighted a 35-foot wooden boat packed with Vietnamese refugees fleeing communist rule in their homeland. The boat sailed from Ben Tre, Vietnam (22 May), but the engine failed two days later and she drifted. Dubuque’s sailors fatally underestimated the numbers of people on board who struggled for survival against starvation and exposure on board their flimsy craft (they estimated 50–70 refugees but 110 people had purportedly put to sea). Dubuque’s commanding officer assessed the situation and decided to distribute food and water to the castaways, as well as charts providing limited navigational information. The Navy later released a statement that “the craft was judged to be in seaworthy condition and was under sail.” Dubuque continued on her original voyage.

The food and water proved inadequate for the actual number of people on board the boat, however; and as many as 58 died, an estimated 20 succumbed before they sighted Dubuque, and the remaining victims following the U.S. ship's departure from the area. Grim tales afterward emerged of desperate people who resorted to cannibalism to survive. Filipino fishermen eventually rescued the 52 survivors. The Navy relieved the Commanding Officer of his command (11 August), and subsequently court martialed him (at his request). The court found him guilty of violating standing orders to render assistance to those in peril of the sea, and he received a letter of reprimand.

In May 1988, she deployed to the Persian Gulf and served as the control ship for mine sweeping operations to protect US-flagged tankers during the Iran–Iraq War. For her participation in this operation, the ship was awarded the Meritorious Unit Commendation. In 1989 the ship participated in the contingency operation to evacuate American personnel from the Philippines during a failed coup attempt.

=== 1990s ===
Immediately following the Iraqi invasion of Kuwait in August 1990, Dubuque was deployed to the Persian Gulf as part of Operation Desert Shield. The ship functioned as the leading element of Amphibious Ready Group Bravo, which transported Marine Regimental Landing Team Four to Al Jubayl, Saudi Arabia during the critical early stages of the multi-national buildup.

In November 1998 Dubuque again deployed to the Persian Gulf as part of the Belleau Wood Amphibious Ready Group (ARG) on support of Operation Desert Fox.

On 30 July 1999, Dubuque was relieved by USS Juneau as part of the forward-deployed naval forces. Since then, she has been once again home-ported in San Diego, California.

From June to September 1999, Dubuque participated in the first SHIP-SWAP with her sister ship Juneau, where each ship's crew remained in their original home ports, allowing Dubuque to return to the homeport of San Diego.

=== 2000s ===
From January to July 2003 Dubuque was deployed with USS Boxer and USS Comstock, transporting the 15th MEU to Iraq in support of Operation Iraqi Freedom where among other missions the ship served as a holding facility for Iraqi POWs. Dubuque also assisted in the protection and maintenance of oil platforms in the northern part of the Persian Gulf. Dubuque served as the air platform that launched the Jessica Lynch rescue mission.

Dubuque deployed again in 2008 with the Peleliu Expeditionary Strike Group. Her crew participated in the pursuit of identifying pirates and collecting intelligence on piracy off the Gulf of Oman and the Horn of Africa. She also participated in rescuing six mariners from a sinking vessel off the Philippine coastline on the way to the Persian Gulf.

In early May 2009 Dubuque had to abort a humanitarian aid mission to the South Pacific after a sailor on board developed Influenza A virus subtype H1N1 during the worldwide 2009 swine flu pandemic. It was later found out that approximately 50 cases were likely also H1N1 (swine flu). As a result, the ship's June 2009 deployment to Oceania in support of the Pacific Partnership program was canceled.

On 9 September 2010, Marines attached to the 15th Marine Expeditionary Unit's Maritime Raid Force launched from Dubuque and boarded and seized control of the German-flagged MV Magellan Star off the coast of Somalia. The pirates had taken control of the ship the previous day. The Marines captured nine pirates and rescued eleven crew members who had taken refuge in a "safe room" on the ship. No shots were fired and no injuries were reported.

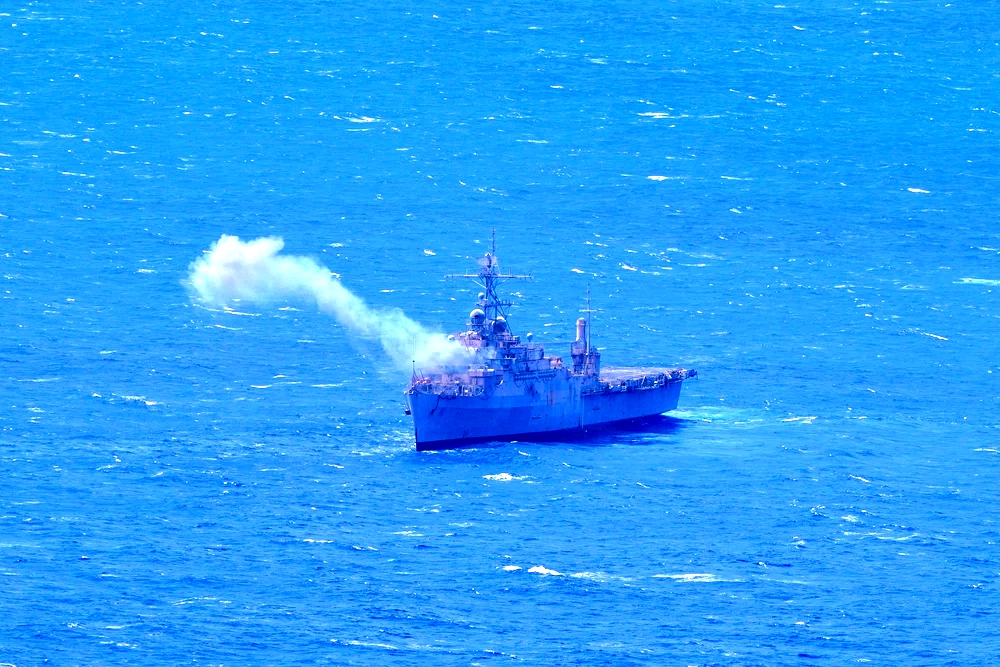
Dubuque being sunk, 11 July 2024

== Fate ==
USS Dubuque was officially decommissioned on 30 June 2011. Dubuque was sunk as a target on 11 July 2024 during the RIMPAC 2024 exercise A number of weapons were used during the test, including a Quicksink bomb dropped from a B-2 Spirit stealth bomber.

== Awards ==
Official ribbons as of 3 March 2002

According to the Navy Awards website, Dubuque has received one Navy Unit Commendation, four Meritorious Unit Commendations, three Battle Efficiency Awards, three Armed Forces Expeditionary Medals, three Humanitarian Service Medals and participated in countless amphibious exercises and operations throughout the Western Pacific and Indian Oceans.
