= USS Nashville (LPD-13) =

Austin-class amphibious transport dock

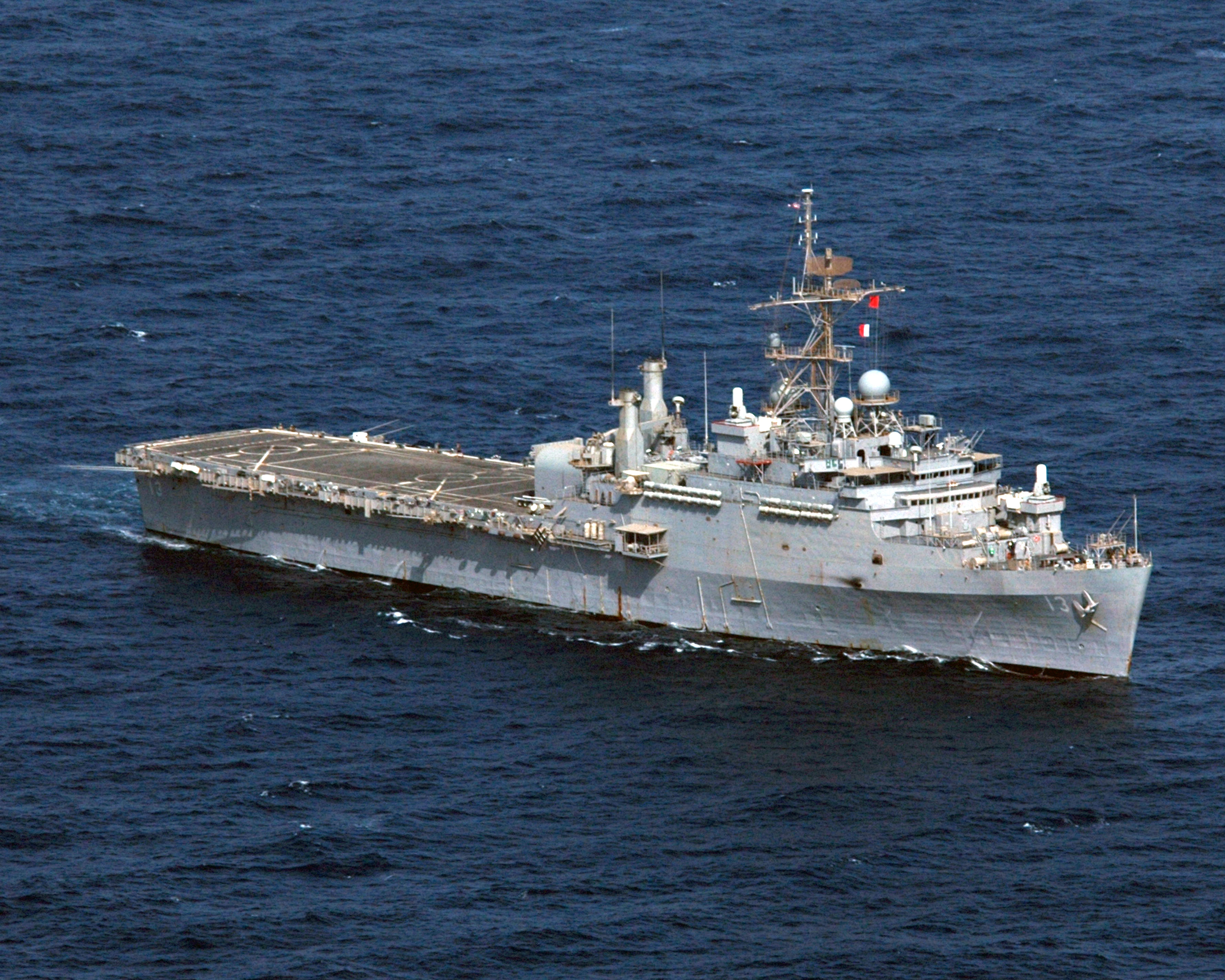
- USS Nashville patrolling the Arabian Sea in 2006

History

United States
- Name: USS Nashville
- Namesake: Nashville, Tennessee
- Operator: United States Navy
- Ordered: 15 May 1964
- Builder: Lockheed Shipbuilding
- Laid down: 14 March 1966
- Launched: 7 October 1967
- Acquired: 26 December 1969
- Commissioned: 14 February 1970
- Decommissioned: 30 September 2009
- Stricken: 13 November 2017
- Fate: Scrapped in Brownsville 2022

General characteristics
- Class & type: Austin-class amphibious transport dock
- Displacement: Light: 9,784 t (9,629 long tons; 10,785 short tons); Full: 17,479 t (17,203 long tons; 19,267 short tons); Dead: 7,695 t (7,573 long tons; 8,482 short tons)
- Length: Overall: 570 ft (170 m); Waterline: 548 ft (167 m)
- Beam: Extreme: 105 ft (32 m); Waterline: 84 ft (26 m)
- Draft: Limit: 23 ft (7.0 m); Ballasted: 34 ft (10 m)
- Propulsion: Two boilers, two steam turbines, two shafts, 24,000 shp (18,000 kW) each
- Speed: 21 knots (39 km/h; 24 mph)
- Complement: Ship's company: 489 (59 officers, 430 enlisted); Marine detachment: 900
- Sensors & processing systems: SPS-40 Air Search Radar; SPS-10 Surface Search Radar; SPS-64 Navigational Radar; Furuno Navigational Radar
- Armament: Two Mk 38 25 mm guns; Two Phalanx CIWS, Eight .50 caliber machine guns
- Aircraft carried: Up to six CH-46 Sea Knight helicopters

USS Nashville (LPD-13), was an Austin-class amphibious transport dock and the third ship of the United States Navy to be named for the capital city of Tennessee. Her keel was laid down on 14 March 1966 by the Lockheed Shipbuilding and Construction Company of Seattle, Washington. She was launched on 7 October 1967 sponsored by Mrs. Roy L. Johnson, and commissioned at Puget Sound Naval Shipyard, Bremerton, Washington, on 14 February 1970.

== History ==
Nashville's various assignments have included four Caribbean Amphibious Ready Groups, eight Mediterranean Groups, two Persian Gulf Groups, a Mine Countermeasure Task Group, North Atlantic Treaty Organization Operations and training assignments with Fleet Marine Force Atlantic.

The ship remained in Amphibious Squadron 2 in 1977. She served as squadron flagship from 1 January through 11 March; 29 April through 21 May; and 10 August through 31 December 1977. In addition, she served as flagship for Commander Combined Amphibious Task Force (Commander Task Force 401), Commander Combined Landing Force, and Commander Task Force 61 (Commander Amphibious Squadron 2) during NATO Exercise Dawn Patrol '77.

Nashville provided support during 8 June 1995 rescue of pilot Capt. Scott O'Grady, who was shot down over Bosnia on 2 June 1995 by an SA-6 mobile launcher and forced to eject from his F-16C into hostile territory.

In 2003, she deployed as part of the Iwo Jima Amphibious Ready Group with the 26th Marine Expeditionary Unit.

On 16 and 17 January 2006, she was the first vessel to receive the landing of an unmanned robotic RQ-8A Fire Scout helicopter.

In July 2006, she was sent to Lebanon as part of the Iwo Jima Expeditionary Strike Group transporting the 24th MEU to assist with the evacuation of U.S. nationals from the country, after a conflict erupted between the Israeli military and Hezbollah militants. On 20 July 2006, it landed the first Marines on Lebanese soil since 1982. The Nashville is featured in an episode of the television program Anthony Bourdain: No Reservations, as it evacuated Americans (including Bourdain and his production crew) from Beirut. The episode was nominated for an Emmy Award.

The USS Nashville was decommissioned on 30 September 2009 at Naval Station Norfolk and moved to the Naval Inactive Ship Maintenance Facility in Philadelphia, Pennsylvania, where it was laid up. Navy officials stated the ship was too costly to maintain and was unable to match the efficiency of newer vessels.

On 22 March 2022, Nashville was removed from the Philadelphia NIMSF and began its journey to Brownsville, Texas, where it will be scrapped. It arrived in Brownsville on 8 April 2022.

== Possible sale to India ==
According to an Indian news source, the Indian Navy may bid to acquire the Nashville, but as of April 2026, India had decided not to move forward with the deal. The Nashville is of the same class as the USS Trenton which was previously sold to India and is now the INS Jalashwa.

== Gallery ==
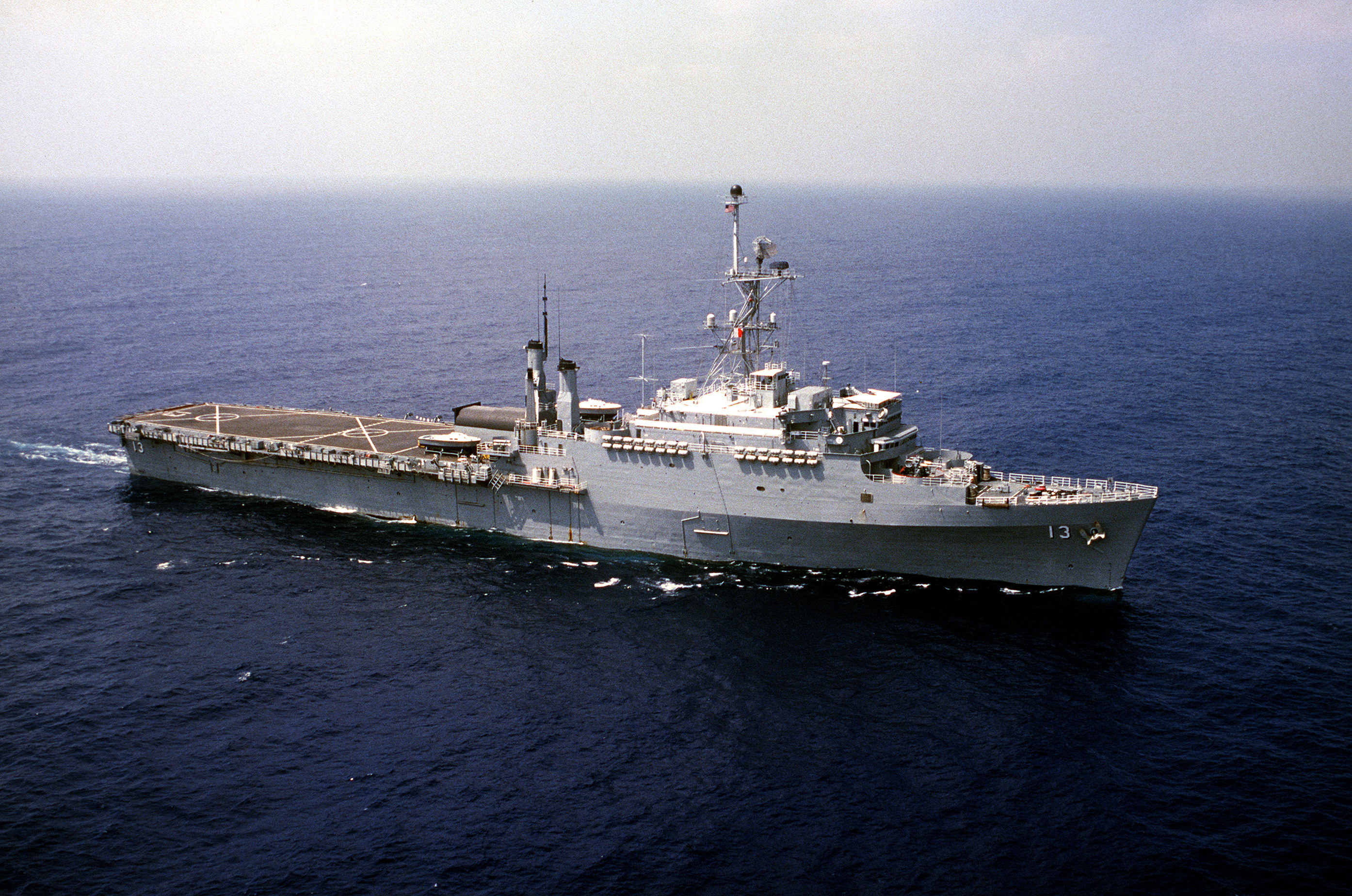
USS Nashville sails off the coast of Lebanon in December 1982

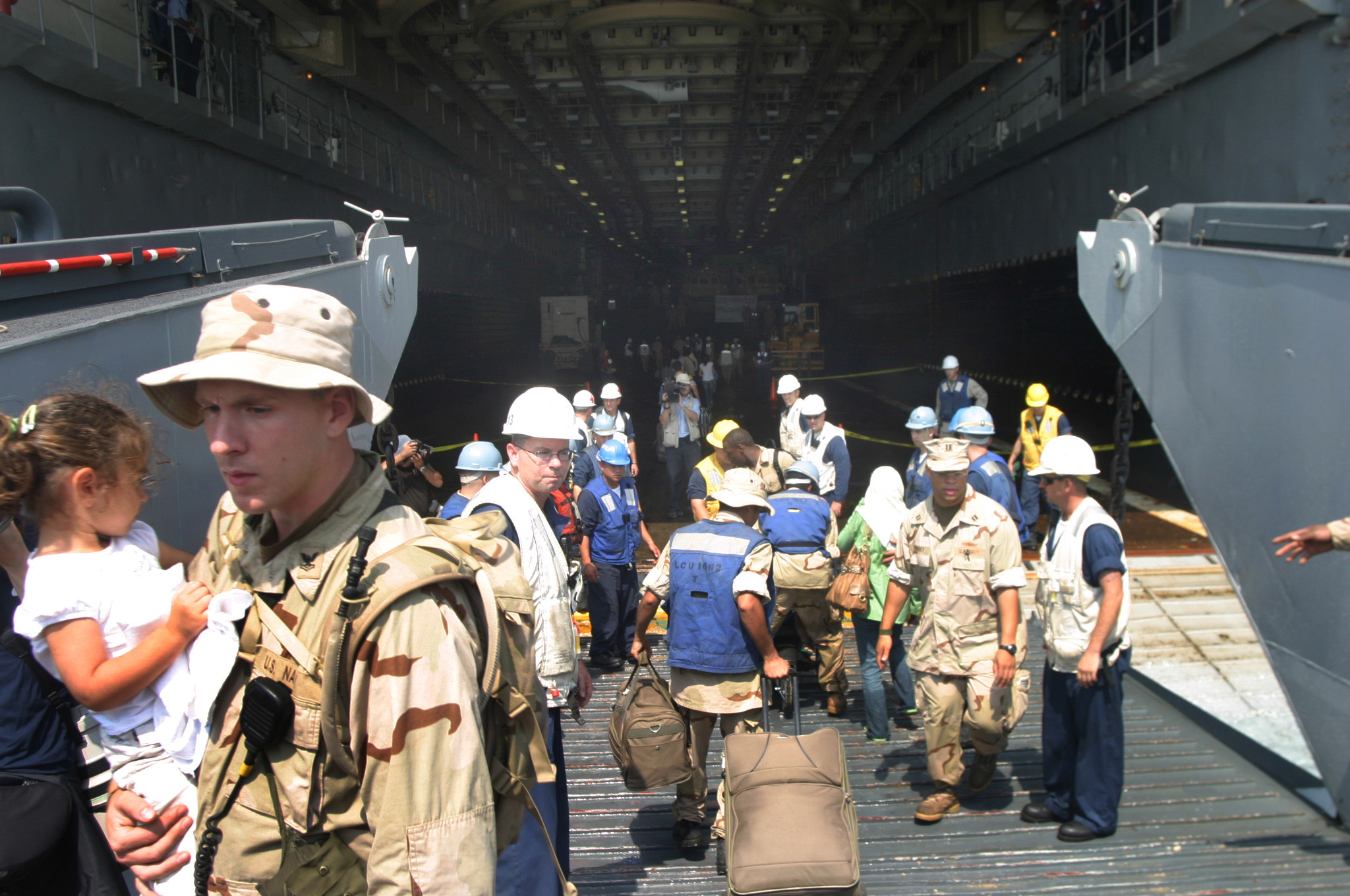
Crewmen from USS Nashville assist U.S. nationals evacuating from Lebanon in 2006

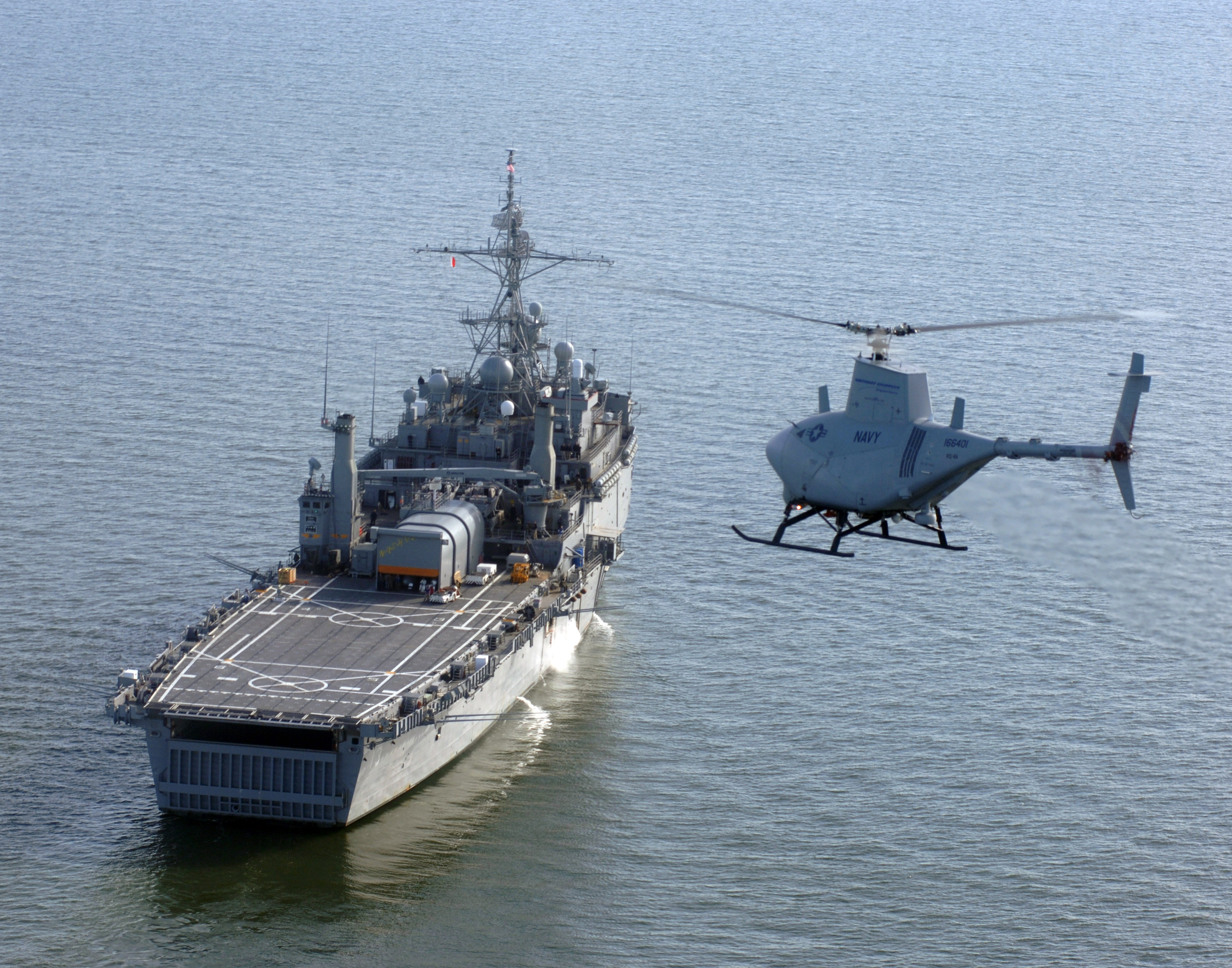
A RQ-8A Fire Scout helicopter preparing to land on USS Nashville
