= Jennifer Moreno =

Nurse and member of the Cultural Support Team program in Afghanistan

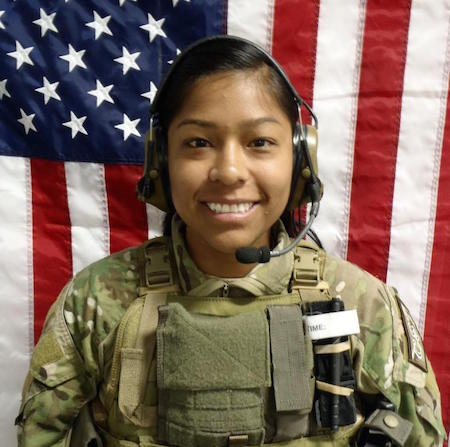
- Born: June 25, 1988; San Diego, California, United States
- Died: October 5, 2013 (aged 25); Zhari District, Afghanistan
- Cause of death: IED
- Education: University of San Francisco; San Diego High School
- Alma mater: University of San Francisco School of Nursing and Health Professions
- Occupations: Nurse, Army Captain
- Organizations: US Army; 75th Ranger Regiment
- Honours: Combat Action Badge; Bronze Star Medal; Purple Heart

Jennifer Moreno (25th June 1988, San Diego, CA–5 October 2013, Afghanistan) was a nurse, part of the Army Special Operations Command cultural support team created by the US Army during the war in Afghanistan. Moreno was posthumously promoted to the rank of Captain and awarded the Combat Action Badge, the Bronze Star Medal, and the Purple Heart after her death in the line of duty.

== Biography ==
Moreno grew up in Logan Heights. Later she obtained her nursing degree from the University of San Francisco on a ROTC scholarship and decided to serve after graduation as a nurse in the U.S. Army. She completed Army Airborne training in 2009 and, while stationed at Joint Base Lewis-McChord in Washington, she volunteered to serve as a Cultural Support Team member attached to the Army’s 75th Ranger Regiment.

Moreno, alongside the members of the female led Cultural Support Team, was an essential mediator for the Special Operations units. The main task of the unit was to help soldiers in the front lines to communicate and mediate with Afghan women, whose interactions with men could be seen as inappropriate in their culture. The Cultural Support Team put women on the front lines during a time when they were still barred from full-time combat jobs in the military.

Moreno died on 5 October 2013, during a Special Operations raid in Zhari District (Afghanistan), when a suicide bomber initiated an ambush in the compound the army team was entering. During the twelve additional blasts that injured 30 Rangers and killed three, Moreno chose to not follow stand-by procedure in order to give essential medical assistance to a fellow soldier trapped nearby, which resulted in the triggering of another IED that led to her death at the age of 25.

== Legacy ==
In March 2022 President Joe Biden signed legislation which renamed the San Diego Veterans Affairs medical center in honor of Capt. Jennifer Moreno. The bill was written by Rep. Mike Levin and it changes the name of the veteran dedicated San Diego medical center to “Jennifer Moreno Department of Veterans Affairs Medical Center.”

In 2022 Moreno became the subject of the award-winning documentary Ultimate Sacrifices Cpt. Jennifer Moreno directed by filmmaker, scholar and veteran Daniel L. Bernardi. The documentary received lots of critical attention and it screened at the opening night of the 2023 GI Film Festival in San Diego, where it won the Best Local Documentary award. Ultimate Sacrifices Cpt. Jennifer Moreno opened the film festival alongside another documentary of women in the military directed by Daniel Bernardi, a short film centred on Navy captain Kathleen Byerly tiled: Time for Change: the Kathy Bruyere Story.
