= Daniel Bernardi =

American media scholar

- Born: June 16, 1964 (age 62); San Juan, Puerto Rico
- Education: University of Arizona, UCLA
- Spouse: Helen Na
- Scientific career
- Fields: media studies, cultural studies, narrative theory, documentary film, critical race theory
- Workplaces: San Francisco State University, United States Navy Reserves, El Dorado Films

Daniel Leonard Bernardi (born June 16, 1964) is a professor of Cinema at San Francisco State University, founder and President of El Dorado Films and a retired Commander in the United States Navy Reserve. Bernardi earned a Bachelor of Arts in Radio-TV (1984) and a Masters of Arts in Media Arts (1988) from the University of Arizona. He went on to earn a PhD in Film and Television Studies from UCLA (1994), completed a University of California postdoctoral research fellowship in 1997, and earned a Master of Public Administration from SFSU in 2023.

== Early life ==
Bernardi was born in San Juan, Puerto Rico to Leonard Bernardi and Giga Bernardi (née Soto), June 16, 1964. Shortly thereafter, the Bernardis moved to their hometown of New York, then eventually relocated to Tucson, Arizona for Giga's asthma. His parents divorced when Bernardi was six years old, and his mother married Cordell R. Carter when Bernardi was thirteen. Following his graduation from high school in 1982, Bernardi joined the United States Navy.

== Military career ==
Bernardi’s initial stint in the military ended shortly after it began, but out of a desire to live up to the tradition of military service established by his father, who served in the United States Air Force, and stepfather, who served in the United States Marine Corps, he decided to enlist again. After receiving a congressional waiver, Bernardi joined the United States Navy Reserve as an intelligence specialist while engaged in his post-doctoral studies (1997). During his second stint in the Navy, Bernardi learned about commissioning opportunities within the service and chose to transition from the intelligence community as an enlisted Sailor to the public affairs restricted line as a commissioned officer. During his service, Bernardi served as Mission Public Affairs Officer aboard amphibious transport dock ship USS Cleveland. Public Affairs Officer Joint Transportation Reserve Unit (JTRU) at Scott Air Force Base, Illinois, 2015-2018, Executive Officer/Acting Commanding Officer U.S. Naval Surface Force U.S. Pacific Fleet at Joint Base Pearl Harbor–Hickam, Hawaii, 2018-2019, Public Affairs Officer Naval Information Warfare Systems Command NR NAVWAR HQ in San Diego, California and participated in a tour of duty in Iraq (which precluded his ability to accept a Fulbright fellowship in 2009), where he trained Iraqi Special Operations Forces (ISOF) and Emergency Response Brigade (ERB) Soldiers on combat camera and media operations, managed US media embeds, including CNN, NBC, AP, US Army and US Navy journalists and photographers. Following his tour in Iraq, Bernardi was the mission public affairs officer for the 2011 iteration of Pacific Partnership, an annual humanitarian assistance initiative sponsored by the United States Pacific Fleet. Bernardi managed a team of military (U.S., Australian and New Zealand) and NGO (Project HOPE) photographers, videographers and writers assigned to document and report on the mission. During his final tour, Bernardi also served at Joint Task Force Guantanamo (JTF-GTMO) in 2020, during the height of the COVID pandemic. Daniel Bernardi retired from the Navy Reserve after 25 years of service.

== Education ==
Bernardi began his collegiate career studying acting at the University of Arizona and entered a feminist film theory course during his junior year. During his exploration of cinema-based semiotics and themes, he learned there was little to no exploration of race in cinema-related academics. The university offered Bernardi a grant to pursue his academic interest in racial explorations of cinema as a graduate student. Following his master’s program, Bernardi relocated to Los Angeles to pursue a career as an actor, worked with the Center Theater Group, found he missed film theory, and began working toward a doctorate.

== Academic career ==
Bernardi has taught film, television and new media at UC Riverside (1997–1998), UCLA (1999-2000), Arizona State University (1999-2011), and SFSU (2011–Present). He was awarded a Ford Foundation Dissertation Fellowship (1994), a UC President's Post-Doctoral Fellowship (1995–1997), and a Fulbright Fellowship (2009). Nonetheless, his deployment to Iraq prevented his acceptance of the Fulbright Fellowship. From 1998 to 2000, he worked for the Sci-Fi Channel as a consultant, writer and producer/host of the web feature Future Now (since deleted).

Since his years at UCLA, Daniel L. Bernardi has earned a reputation of notoriety among the more avid Star Trek fans due to his writings about the role of race in the films, especially through his 1998 book Star Trek and History: Race-ing Toward a White Future".

Following his tour in Iraq and the South Pacific, Bernardi, working with a larger research team including H. L. (Bud) Goodall Jr., received a $1.6 million renewable grant from the Office of Naval Research to catalogue and study the impact rumors have on counterinsurgency operations. The aim of the project is for expeditionary forces to have access to these narratives and to work against them through the team's analysis.

In 2026, Bernardi provided cultural commentary on the media legacy and societal impact of the O.J. Simpson murder trial, noting that the case remains a cultural mechanism for examining issues of race, gender, and domestic violence in the United States.

=== Veteran Documentary Corps (2012–present) ===
Inspired by his own experiences, in 2012, Bernardi launched the Veteran Documentary Corps (VDC), a documentary project founded by donations and grants, the VA and National Cemetery Administration including. VDC produces and exhibits short documentaries on the struggles and successes of veterans from across the world. The Veteran Documentary Corps has produced and distributed more than fifty short documentaries on veterans dealing with post-traumatic stress disorder (PTSD), the fall-out of the former "don't ask, don't tell" policy, and a range of other topics. Bernardi contributes to the project both as filmmaker and producer, and all the films are made by professional filmmakers including Jesse Moss, Andrés Gallegos, Silvia Turchin, Eliciana Nascimento, among others.

The Veteran Documentary Corps was met with wide acclaim and was received positively from veterans and the general public alike. Following these successes, Bernardi created in 2018 El Dorado Films, the distributor of Veteran Documentary Corps (VDC) films. Similarly, El Dorado Films is a specialized filmmaking collective that works across the U.S. and around the world to craft compelling documentaries, shorts, and commercials, which offers also an online streaming platform.

Daniel Bernardi's documentaries have received a wide international reception on the international film festival circuit and won many prizes. In 2023 two of his latest documentaries on women in the military: Time for Change: Kathy Bruyere and Ultimate Sacrifices: Cpt. Jennifer Moreno screened at the opening night of the 2023 GI Film Festival San Diego. His 2023 film, Triumph Over Prejudice: The Montford Point Marines, opened the 2025 'Best of the Fest' GI Film Festival in Washington, D.C.

== Bibliography ==
=== Authored works ===
- Off the Page: Screenwriting in the Era of Media Convergence (co-author). 2017. University of California Press.
- Narrative Landmines: Rumors, Islamist Extremism, and the Struggle for Strategic Influence Rumors (co-authored). 2012. Rutgers University Press.
- Star Trek and History: Race-ing Toward a White Future". 1998. Rutgers University Press. ISBN 0-8135-2466-0

=== Edited collections ===
- Race in American Film: Voices and Visions That Shaped a Nation, Volumes I, II and III. (co-editor). 2017. Greenwood Publishers.
- Hollywood's Chosen People: The Jewish Experience in American Cinema(co-edited). 2012. Wayne State University Press. ISBN 9780814334829
- Filming Difference: Actors, Directors, Producers and Writers on Gender, Race and Sexuality in Film. 2009. University of Texas Press. ISBN 0-292-71974-4
- The Persistence of Whiteness. 2007. Routledge. ISBN 0-415-77412-8
- Classic Hollywood/Classic Whiteness. 2001. University of Minnesota Press. ISBN 0-8166-3239-1
- The Birth of Whiteness: Race and the Emergence of U.S. Cinema. 1996. Rutgers University Press. ISBN 0-8135-2276-5

Bernardi's interest in the representation of race is still present and he actively writes for American newspapers on contemporary films, such as the upcoming biopic on Leonard Bernstein 'Maestro'.

== Filmography ==
=== Director ===
Film	Year	Format	Distribution
Tim Kochis: Purple Heart	2013	Short	Amazon, ProQuest, Kanopy, InfoBase, AlexanderStreet
Michael Blackwell: Combat Camera	2014	Short	Amazon, ProQuest, Kanopy, InfoBase, AlexanderStreet, PBS Plus
Ralph Rush: Concentration Camp Liberator	2015	Short	Amazon, ProQuest, Kanopy, InfoBase, AlexanderStreet
Jack Ensch: Hanoi Hilton POW	2016	Short	Amazon, ProQuest, InfoBase, AlexanderStreet
The American War	2018	Feature	ProQuest, Kanopy, InfoBase, AlexanderStreet
Noble Sissle Jr.: Am I Still Going to Vietnam?	2018	Short	Amazon, ProQuest, InfoBase, AlexanderStreet
Noble Sissle's Syncopated Ragtime	2018	Short	Amazon, ProQuest, Kanopy, InfoBase, AlexanderStreet
The War to End All Wars… and its American Veterans	2019	Feature	ProQuest, Kanopy, InfoBase, Video Elephant, AlexanderStreet
The Forgotten War	2020	Feature	Amazon, ProQuest, Kanopy, InfoBase, Video Elephant, AlexanderStreet
Ionosphere: Dr. Eliana Nossa	2020	Short	ProQuest, InfoBase, AlexanderStreet,
Near Earth Asteroids: Dr. Anne Virkki	2020	Short	ProQuest, InfoBase, AlexanderStreet
Buck Southworth: U.S. Air Force Flight Crew	2021	Short	Amazon, ProQuest, InfoBase, Video Elephant, AlexanderStreet
Navigator: Lt. Col. Ken Murray	2022	Short	ProQuest, AlexanderStreet
Solar Weather: Dr. Alessandra Pacini	2022	Short	ProQuest, InfoBase, AlexanderStreet
Time for Change: Kathy Bruyere	2022	Short	Amazon, ProQuest, AlexanderStreet
Ultimate Sacrifices: CPT. Jennifer Moreno	2022	Feature	Amazon, ProQuest, InfoBase, AlexanderStreet
The Architect: A Montford Point Marine	2023	Short	Amazon, ProQuest, AlexanderStreet
Conte: Transitioning Politics	2023	Short	Amazon, ProQuest, AlexanderStreet
The Jock: A Montford Point Marine	2023	Short	Amazon, ProQuest, AlexanderStreet
Triumph Over Prejudice: The Montford Point Marines	2023	Feature	InfoBase
You Don't Know Jack: A Montford Point Marine	2023	Short	Amazon, ProQuest, AlexanderStreet
Hope: In the Aftermath of War	2025	Short	ProQuest, InfoBase
Resilience: The Kim LeBel Story	2025	Short	ProQuest, InfoBase

=== Producer ===
Film	Director	Year
David Gan: The Front Lines	David Washburn	2012
John Heroux: Gulf War Fighter Pilot	David Washburn	2012
Bobby Hollingsworth: Army CID	Silvia Turchin	2013
Casey Conklin: Ranger Battalion	Adan Pulido	2013
Jack Lyon: Veterans Serving Veterans	John Giannini	2013
Julie Mendez: From PTSD to Art	Silvia Turchin	2013
Scott Castle: Battle of Fallujah	Silvia Turchin	2013
Zoe Dunning: Repealing "Don't Ask, Don't Tell"	Silvia Turchin	2013
Aldo Giannini: Pacific Theatre	John Giannini	2014
Giorgio Mattia: From Kosovo to Iraq	Maria Luisa Forenza	2014
John Baumhackl: Chemical Memories	Adan Pulido	2014
Tiffany McKinley: Sailor	David Washburn	2014
Hank Sciaroni: Shot Down	Robert Barbarino	2015
Joel Hunt: Traumatic Brain Injury (TBI)	Valerie Soe	2015
Tian Soepangat: Muslim Sailor	David Washburn	2015
Adele Shimanoff: U.S. Marine	Hannah Anderson	2016
Jackie Speier: Sexual Assault in the Military	Jennifer Hammett	2016
Abina and the Important Men	Soumyaa Behrens	2017
Admiral Chester Nimitz	Alexander Zane Irwin	2017
Brevet Major Pauline Cushman-Fryer: Civil War Spy	Allyce Ondricka	2017
Buffalo Soldiers, Victorio and Manifest Destiny	Alexander Zane Irwin	2017
Cpl. Richard Carlson: A Brother's Loss	Andrés Gallegos	2017
Fighting Fred Funston	Andrés Gallegos	2017
John Stevens: Storming the Beach	Jesse Moss	2017
Lt. Cmdr. Che Barnes: Fallen Brother	Alexander Zane Irwin	2017
Nisei Soldiers: Japanese American G.I. Joes	Alexander Zane Irwin	2017
PFC Benjamin Tollefson: A Mom's Loss	Andrés Gallegos	2017
Pride of the Buffalo Soldier	Allyce Ondricka	2017
Remembering Port Chicago	Alexander Zane Irwin	2017
Rory Fanning: From Ranger to Resister	Michael Behrens	2017
Fighter Pilots of Vietnam	Carolina Gratianne	2018
John Henry Balch: Congressional Medal of Honor	Sreang Hok	2018
Madame Mars: Women and the Quest for Worlds Beyond	Jan Millsapps	2018
Major Raoul Lufbery: Fighter Ace	Alexander Zane Irwin	2018
Nurse Helen Fairchild: Killed in Action?	Eliciana Nascimento	2018
Samuel Wilder King: Fighting for Statehood	Carolina Gratianne	2018
Guy Hircefeld: A Guy with a Camera	Andrés Gallegos	2019
Leo Patrick McArdle: Veterans Helping Veterans	Allyce Ondricka	2019
Objector	Molly Stuart	2019
Alene B. Duerk: The First Woman Admiral	Eliciana Nascimento	2020
Frank Maselskis: From WWII POW to Chosin Reservoir Survivor	Andrés Gallegos	2020
Ralph Parr: Fighter Ace of the Twentieth Century	Alexander Zane Irwin	2020
Rudy Hernandez: Congressional Medal of Honor	David de Rozas	2020
Pam Roark: Iraq War Nurse	Natalya Sharapova	2020
The Bataan Death March	Jesse Sutterley	2021
Foghorn: Child Actor, Veteran, Friend	Diana Sánchez	2021
Immigrant Service: Focus on Jesus Duran	Andrés Gallegos	2021
Vincent Faulls: A Collection of My Father	Jesse Sutterley	2021
Who is Weary Willie?	Constanza Hevia	2021
From Mexico to Vietnam: A Chicano Story	Andrés Gallegos	2022
Merchant Marine Paul Goercke and the Alexander Hamilton Post	Alexander Zane Irwin	2022
Baptiste Garnier and the Indian Wars	Sean Restivo	2023
Black Women and World War II: The 6888th Central Postal Directory Battalion	Gina Gelphman	2023
Buffalo Soldiers: George Jordan and the Indian Wars	Josh Cardenas	2023
Carson Bigbee: The Pirate of America's Pastime	Robert Barbarino	2023
The Chaplain: MAJ Brenda Threatt	Jesse Sutterley	2023
Decoding Jean: Secrets of WWII	Hannah Anderson	2023
Do Ask, Do Tell: The Linda Campbell Story	Birdy Hung	2023
Gianmarco Bellini: Gulf War POW	Maria Luisa Forenza	2023
The Gunnery: A Montford Point Marine	Jesse Sutterley	2023
Ruiz	Jesse Sutterley	2023
The Singer: A Montford Point Marine	Eliciana Nascimento	2023
The Sioux: From Red Cloud to Wounded Knee	Sean Restivo	2023
Velda: A Mother's Story of Suicide	Jesse Sutterley	2023
All Equal!	Cheikh Ahmadou Bamba Diop	2024
Generations of Service: The LaShaunda Jackson Story	Gina Gelphman	2024
In Honor of Adrianna: A Warrior's Love Story	Caitlin Williams	2024

== Selected publications ==
- Bernardi, Daniel. The Birth of Whiteness: Race and the Emergence of U.S. Cinema. 1996. Rutgers University Press. ISBN 0-8135-2276-5
- Bernardi, Daniel. Star Trek and History: Race-ing Toward a White Future. 1998. Rutgers University Press. ISBN 0-8135-2466-0
- Bernardi, Daniel. "Where's the Beef?" Flow On-line, Volume 2. April 1, 2005.
- "Narrative Landmines: The Explosive Effects of Rumors in Syria and Insurgencies Around the World". Small Wars Journal. March 21, 2013.
- Word:ChristChurch, Autumn Season 2017. "James Gleick: Time Travel Feat. James Gleick, Dr Daniel Bernardi (interviewer)". Audiomack. July 19, 2017.
- "Prof. Daniel Bernardi on Star Trek and Race." (interview with Bernardi) Trekdom - Star Trek Fanzine. June 25, 2007.
- "Lt. Cmdr. Daniel Bernardi." In Depth Show. Federal News Radio. January 10, 2014. Radio.
- "Bellevue woman’s unspoken heroism during World War II may soon become a full-length film"
- New York Times serial podcast: "Guantanamo" (episode four)
