= USS Peleliu =

Amphibious assault ship of the U.S. Navy

Coordinates: 21.3732154°N 157.9809546°W

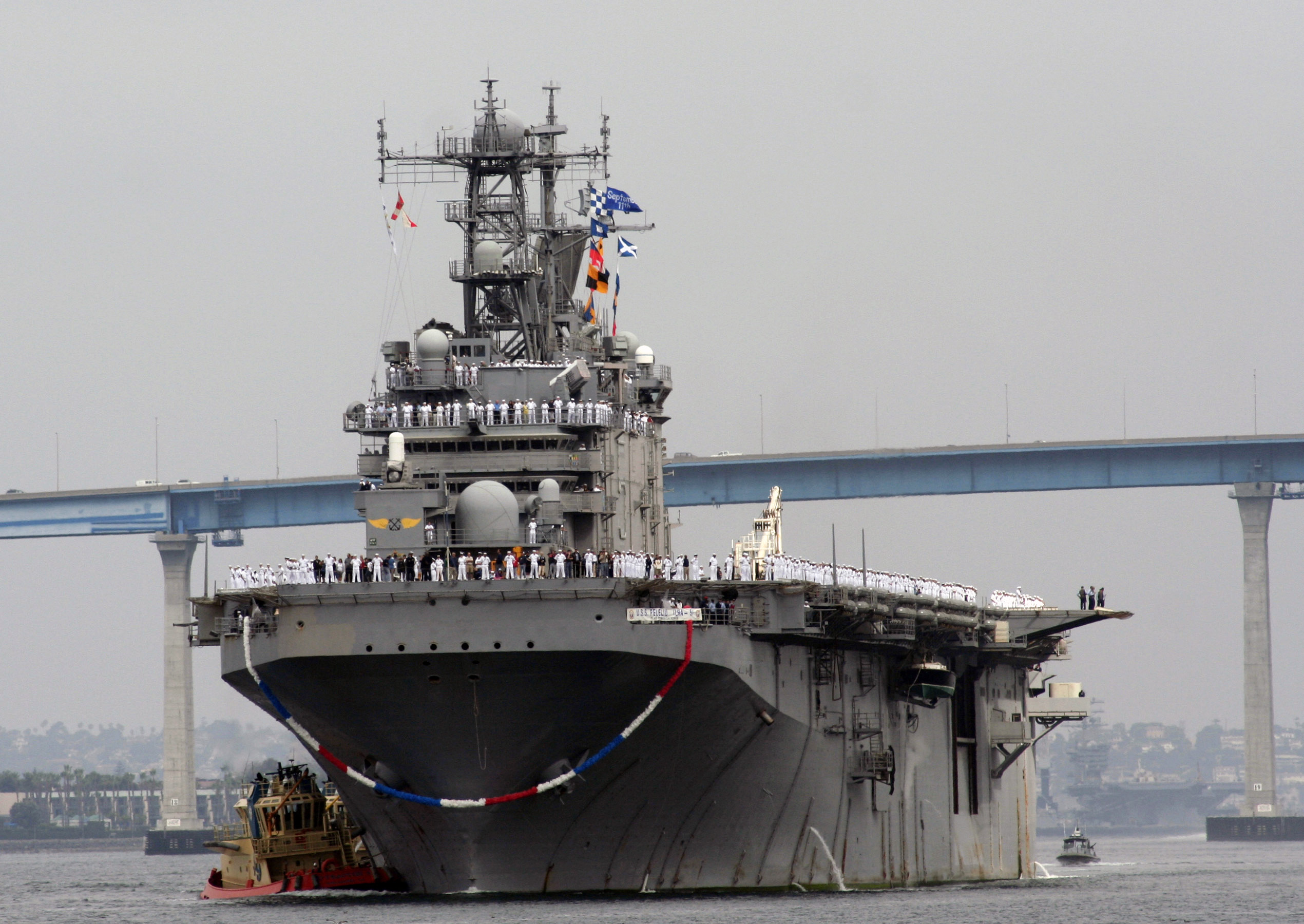
- USS Peleliu on 16 August 2006

History

United States
- Name: Peleliu
- Namesake: Battle of Peleliu
- Ordered: 6 November 1970
- Builder: Ingalls Shipbuilding
- Laid down: 12 November 1976
- Launched: 25 November 1978
- Commissioned: 3 May 1980
- Decommissioned: 31 March 2015
- Renamed: from Da Nang
- Stricken: 30 April 2024
- Home port: San Diego
- Identification: Callsign: NPEL; Hull number: LHA-5
- Motto: Pax per Potens; (Peace through power)
- Nickname(s): The Fighting Five; Iron Nickel
- Fate: Sunk as target 17 July 2026
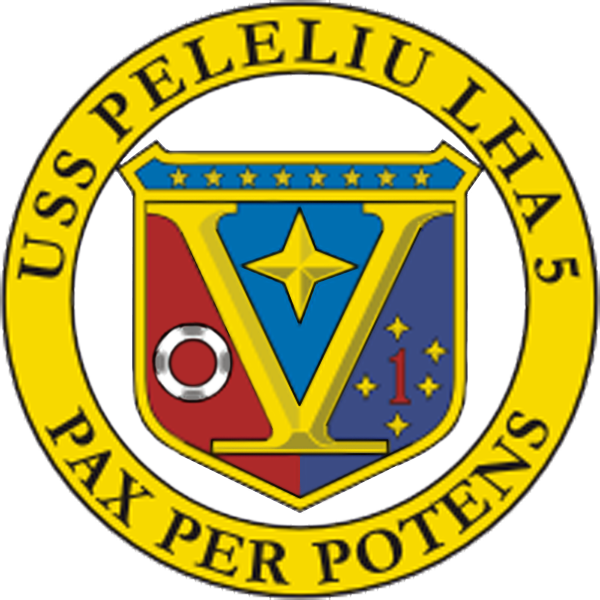
- Badge

General characteristics
- Class & type: Tarawa-class amphibious assault ship
- Displacement: 39,438 long tons full and; 25,982 tons light
- Length: 820 ft (250 m)
- Beam: 106.6 ft (32.5 m)
- Draft: 27 ft (8.2 m)
- Propulsion: 2 steam combustion engineering modified super 6 boilers; 2 Westinghouse steam turbines
- Speed: 24 knots (44 km/h; 28 mph)
- Complement: 262 officers and about 2,543 enlisted men
- Armament: Two rolling airframe missile launchers, four 25 mm Mk 38 Bushmaster gun mounts, two Phalanx CIWS for self-defense, five 0.5 in (12.7 mm) machine guns.; These ships were built with an offensive armament with three 5-inch rapid-fire naval guns and a defense of two Mk 115 Basic Point Defense Missile guided missile units.
- Aircraft carried: (typical) Six AV-8B Harrier attack planes; four AH-1Z Viper attack helicopters; 12 CH-46 Sea Knight helicopters; nine CH-53 Sea Stallion heavy helicopters; four UH-1Y Venom utility helicopters, and two V-22 Ospreys.
- Aviation facilities: hangar deck

USS Peleliu (LHA-5) was a Tarawa-class amphibious assault ship of the United States Navy, named for the Battle of Peleliu of World War II. Entering service in 1980, she has been deployed to the Persian Gulf on several occasions, performed an evacuation of U.S. Naval Base Subic Bay following the eruption of Mount Pinatubo, operated with the INTERFET peacekeeping taskforce, participated in Pacific Partnership deployments, and provided assistance following the massive floods in Pakistan in 2010. She was decommissioned in San Diego, California on 31 March 2015. She rested, out of commission and in reserve, at NAVSEA Inactive Ships On-site Maintenance Office, Pearl Harbor, Hawaii, in the inactive reserve in case of further need. In late April 2026, ex-Peleliu was towed in and out of Pearl Harbor. Ex-Peleliu was towed out to sea in order to simulate battle damage in various spaces and then towed back to Ford Island as part of the Repair Technology Exercise (REPTX), which brought together various technologies for inspection, repair, and/or prevention of damage. ex-Peleliu was sunk during RIMPAC 26 SINKEX.

== Design and construction ==
Peleliu was originally going to be named USS Khe Sanh, and then USS Da Nang. Peleliu's keel was laid down in 1976 at the Litton Industries Ingalls Shipbuilding company in Pascagoula, Mississippi. She was launched on 25 November 1978, sponsored by Peggy Hayward, the wife of the Chief of Naval Operations at that time, Admiral Thomas B. Hayward. Peleliu was commissioned on 3 May 1980.

== Operational history ==
=== 1980s ===
Peleliu immediately steamed southwards and transited the Panama Canal to the Pacific Ocean. She crossed the Equator for the first time on 27 May 1980, setting a new record for time between an American warship's commissioning and her crossing over into the Southern Hemisphere. Peleliu then steamed to the seaport of Long Beach, California.

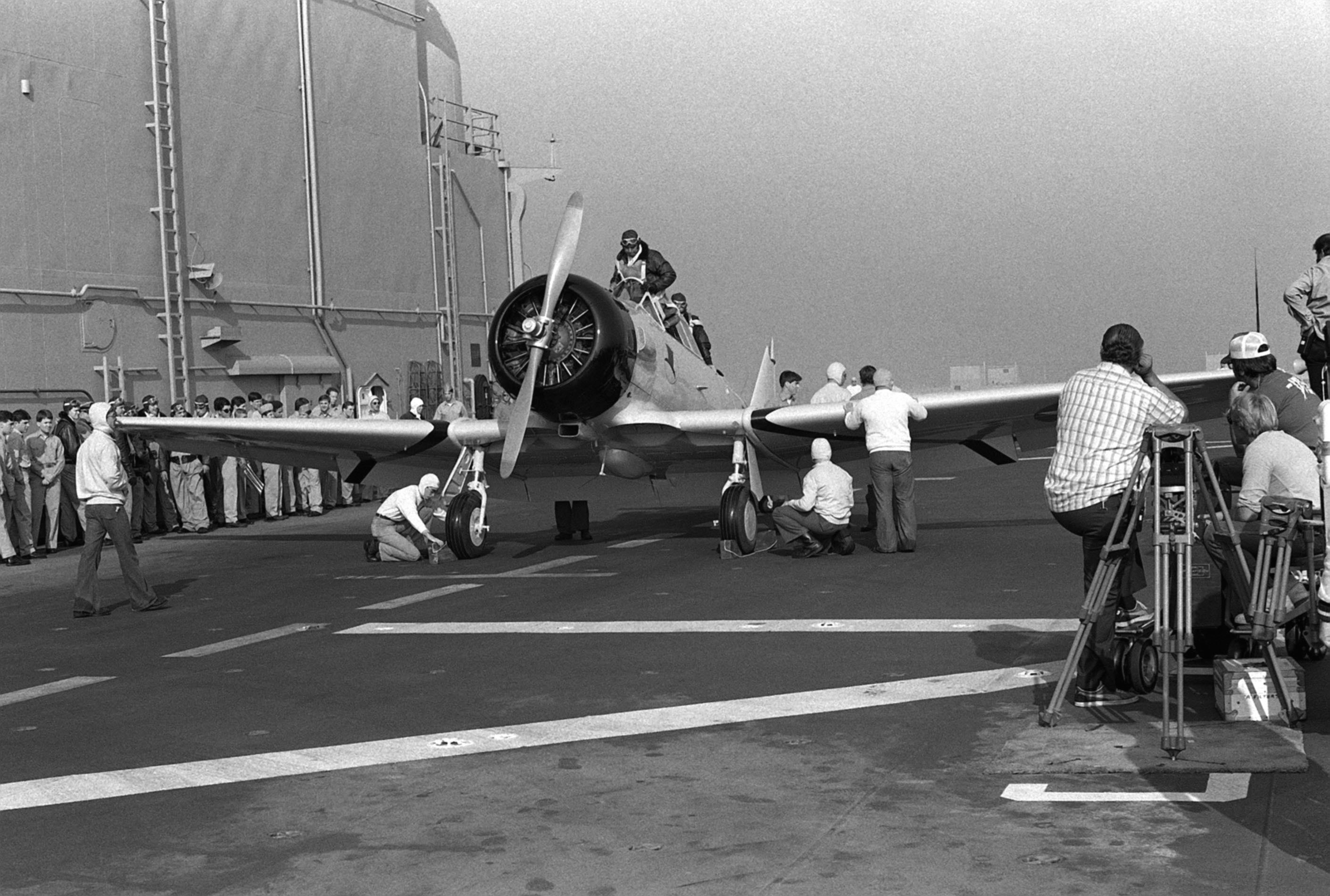
T-6 Texan aboard Peleliu in 1981 during the filming of The Winds of War. The ship was doubling for the aircraft carrier USS Enterprise.

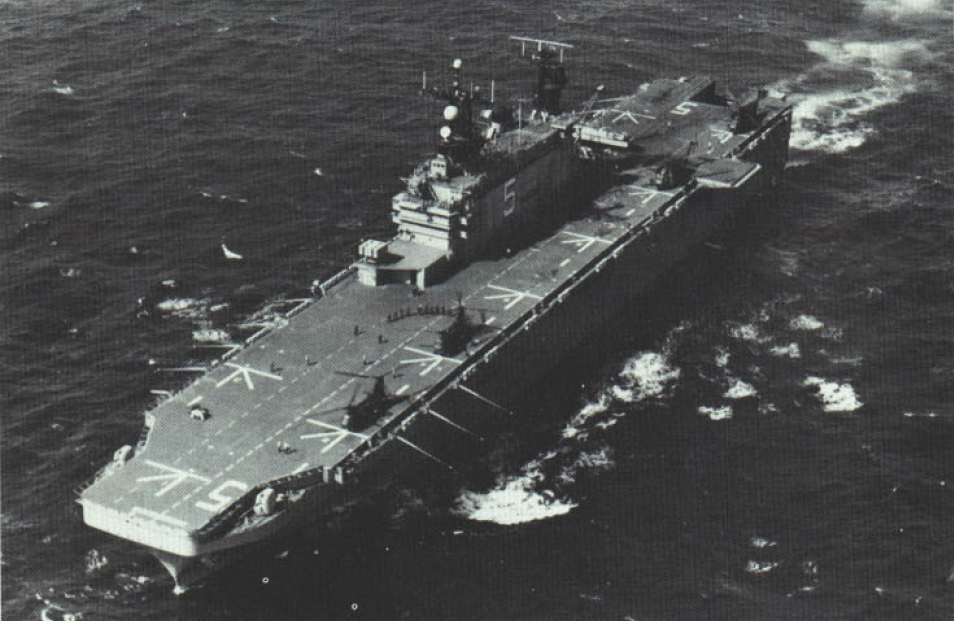
Peleliu off Australia in 1982.

Following the 17 October 1989 Loma Prieta earthquake, Peleliu was one of the 24 U.S. Navy and Military Sealift Command ships that rendered assistance. Peleliu provided shelter for 300 victims and provided helicopter support.

=== 1990s ===
Peleliu deployed again to the Western Pacific in January 1990. The ship, along with her Amphibious Ready Group (ARG), participated in multinational exercises including Exercise Team Spirit with forces from the Republic of Korea, and Exercise Cobra Gold, in Thailand. Peleliu returned home to Naval Station Long Beach in July and later that summer entered the shipyard for an availability period that was scheduled to last nearly a year. The U.S. response to the Iraqi invasion of Kuwait in August 1990 curtailed the shipyard availability and forced Peleliu into an accelerated schedule of pre-deployment training, but she did not deploy for Operation Desert Shield/Desert Storm. She eventually departed Long Beach in May 1991, in support of ongoing U.S. operations in the Middle East. In June 1991, while en route to the Persian Gulf, she was diverted from a scheduled port call in Hong Kong to the Philippines, where she participated in the evacuation of the Americans from the Naval Base Subic Bay following the volcanic eruption of Mount Pinatubo. This evacuation included taking most of the patients from the maternity ward at the Subic Bay naval hospital, and hence there were several births on board. This eruption was one of the largest of the past 100 years and covered a large region of the Philippines in volcanic ash and caused extensive damage to American military bases in the area, including Naval Station Subic Bay, Naval Air Station Cubi Point, and Clark Air Force Base.

On returning to her home port at Long Beach Naval Shipyard, Peleliu went through an extensive shipyard rehabilitation, including time in the dry dock. She was again underway by May 1992 and going through workups and inspections for her next Western Pacific (WESTPAC) deployment on 21 January 1994. She changed home ports to Naval Station San Diego during this time period. On deploying with the 11th Marine Expeditionary Unit, and following stops in Pearl Harbor and Singapore, she steamed for Mogadishu, Somalia to participate in Operation Continue Hope and Operation Quick Draw. She arrived on station around 3 March 1994 and spent the next three months supporting operations in the area. VIP visits included Chairman of the Joint Chiefs of Staff General John Shalikashvili, COMPHIBGRU THREE, Rear Admiral James B. Perkins III, and CJTF Major General Thomas M. Montgomery, U.S. Army and Brig. General Vercauteren, USMC. While off the coast of Mombasa, she participated in Operation Distant Runner at the border of Rwanda and Burundi. Medical and Dental Civic Action Programs(MEDCAP, DENCAP) were performed in the villages of Kipini and Witu, Kenya, providing medical and dental services to local civilians. Leaving Somalia on 4 June 1994, she steamed to Perth, Australia for a port visit. On 30 June 1994, Peleliu slowed her pace home and along with ship's company, Marines of 2nd Battalion 5th Marines, paused to honor the fallen off the coast of her name sake Peleliu, where 50 years earlier the Marines of the 1st Marine Division suffered 6,526 casualties with 1,256 killed in action against 10,138 Japanese defenders of which very few were taken alive in the Battle of Peleliu.

Peleliu again deployed to the Western Pacifice and to the Persian Gulf in November 1995. The 15th Marine Expeditionary Unit/Special Operations Capable, partially comprising aviation units from the Third Marine Aircraft Wing, (HMM-268 REIN) embarked on board Peleliu. The ship eventually arrived in the Persian Gulf in support Operation Southern Watch. Peleliu made port calls at Pearl Harbor, Okinawa, Hong Kong, Singapore, and Phuket.

Peleliu was deployed to East Timor as part of the Australian-led INTERFET peacekeeping task force from 26 October to 27 November 1999.

=== 2000s ===
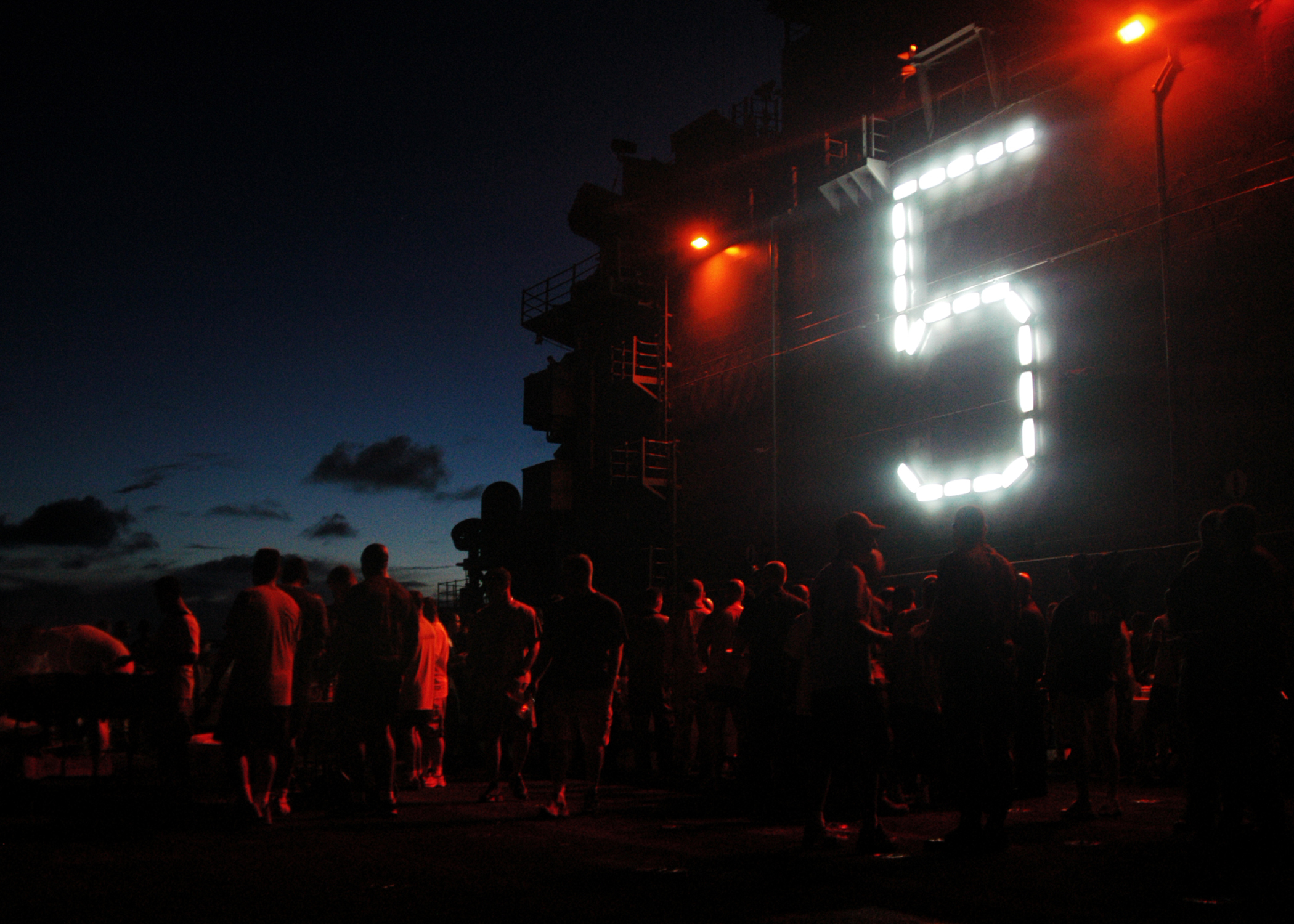
Peleliu at dusk

Peleliu departed from San Diego in August 2001 with the 15th Marine Expeditionary Unit on board for a six-month deployment in the Western Pacific. She was in the port of Darwin, Australia during the September 11 attacks. Following those attacks, Peleliu was sent to the North Arabian Sea and, on 26 November 2001, she took the first U.S. Marines to Afghanistan as part of Operation Enduring Freedom. After the American Taliban John Walker Lindh was captured in Afghanistan, he was taken aboard Peleliu on 14 December 2001. There he was interrogated by a U.S. Marine Corps intelligence team. While he was on board, Lindh signed confessions and he told his interrogators that he was not merely a member of the Taliban, but a full member of Al Qaeda.

Lindh received surgery by the senior surgeon of Peleliu to remove a bullet in his leg, and he was also treated for frostbite on his toes.

While on deployment in support of Operation Iraqi Freedom, in 2004, and as flagship of Expeditionary Strike Group One, a hostile boat was intercepted by warships at sea in the Indian Ocean, and 15 people were detained. An estimated 2,800 pounds (1,300 kg) of hashish was seized by American and Australian warships after the interception of the boat in the North Arabian Sea. During this deployment Peleliu was deployed for nine months and supported air strikes into Iraq. Marines from the embarked Marine Expeditionary Unit participated in ground operations in southern Iraq.

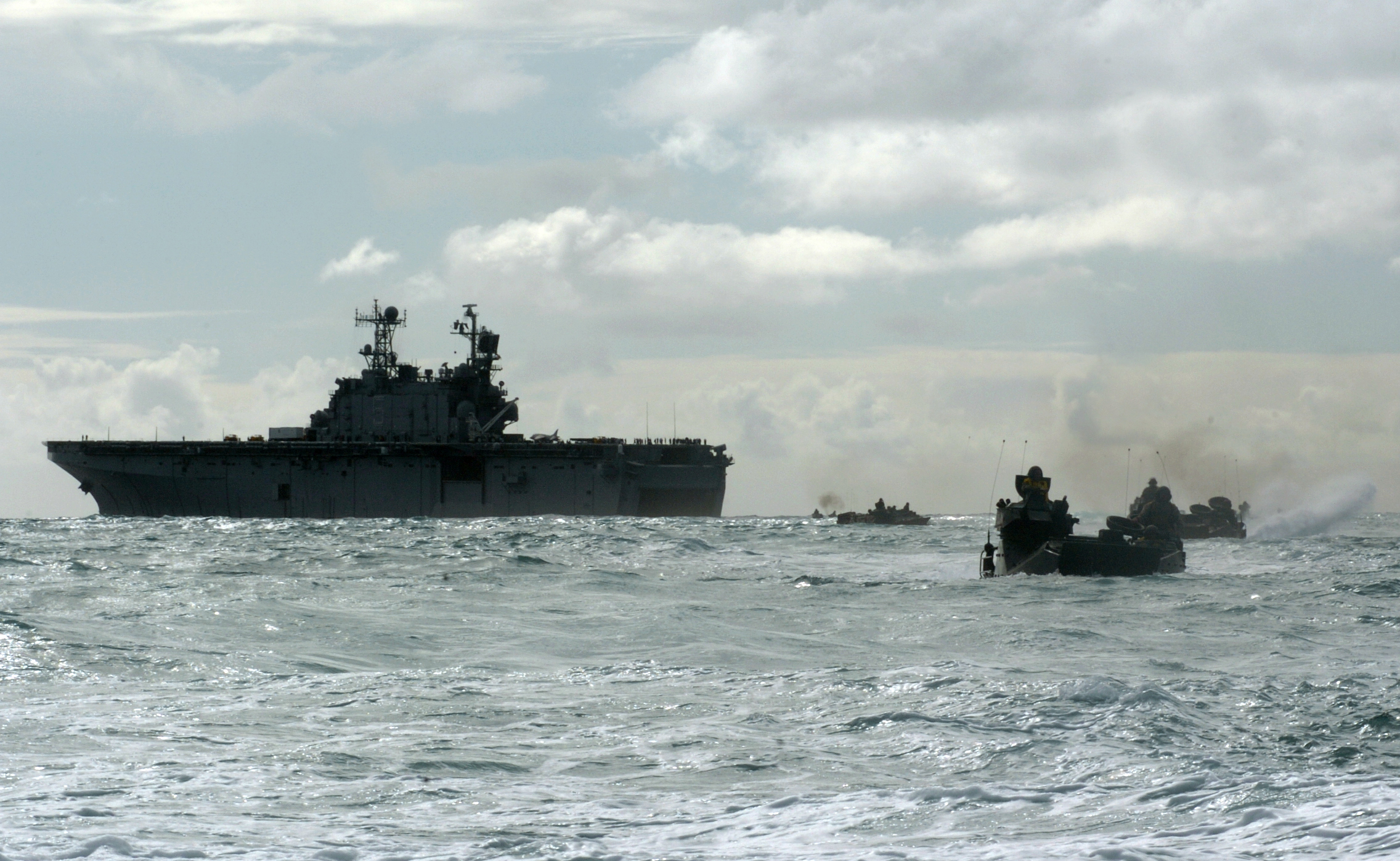
The 3rd Assault Amphibian Battalion departs Peleliu during exercises off the coast of Hawaii in 2005

Peleliu steamed to support of the Pacific Partnership mission from 23 May through 20 September 2007. This mission included medical, dental, construction, and other humanitarian assistance programs on shore and afloat in the Philippines, Vietnam, Papua New Guinea, the Solomon Islands, and the Marshall Islands. The medical personnel on board Peleliu included teams from the U.S. Navy and ten other countries, and also from three private assistance organizations.

In 2008, Peleliu was sent to the Indian Ocean to support Operation Iraqi Freedom, Operation Enduring Freedom, and antipiracy operations. On 10 August 2008, Peleliu responded to a distress call from a merchant ship, Gem of Kilakari, that was being attacked by armed pirates in the Gulf of Aden. That pirate attack was suppressed with no injuries.

=== 2010s ===
In August 2010, Peleliu was sent to Port of Karachi, Pakistan, to use 19 of her helicopters for rescue during the massive floods in southern Pakistan, which were the worst in the recorded history of Pakistan up to that point.

During this deployment, Peleliu's commanding officer was relieved of command and reassigned for being "unduly familiar" with several crewmembers. The chief of staff for Expeditionary Strike Group 3, was then assigned as the commanding officer of Peleliu.

On 24 November 2010, Peleliu returned full circle and she was berthed in the Subic Bay Freeport Zone on her first visit there since the evacuation by the Navy in 1991. That deployment also included port visits to: Naval Base Guam, Apra Harbor, Guam; Darwin, Australia; Dubai, UAE; Phuket, Thailand; and Pearl Harbor, Hawaiʻi before returning to her home port in San Diego, California on 18 Dec 2010.

On 17 September 2012, Peleliu deployed to the C5F AOR. On 14 May 2013, Peleliu returned to her homeport after an eight-month deployment, accompanied by the USS Green Bay (LPD-20) and the USS Rushmore (LSD-47).

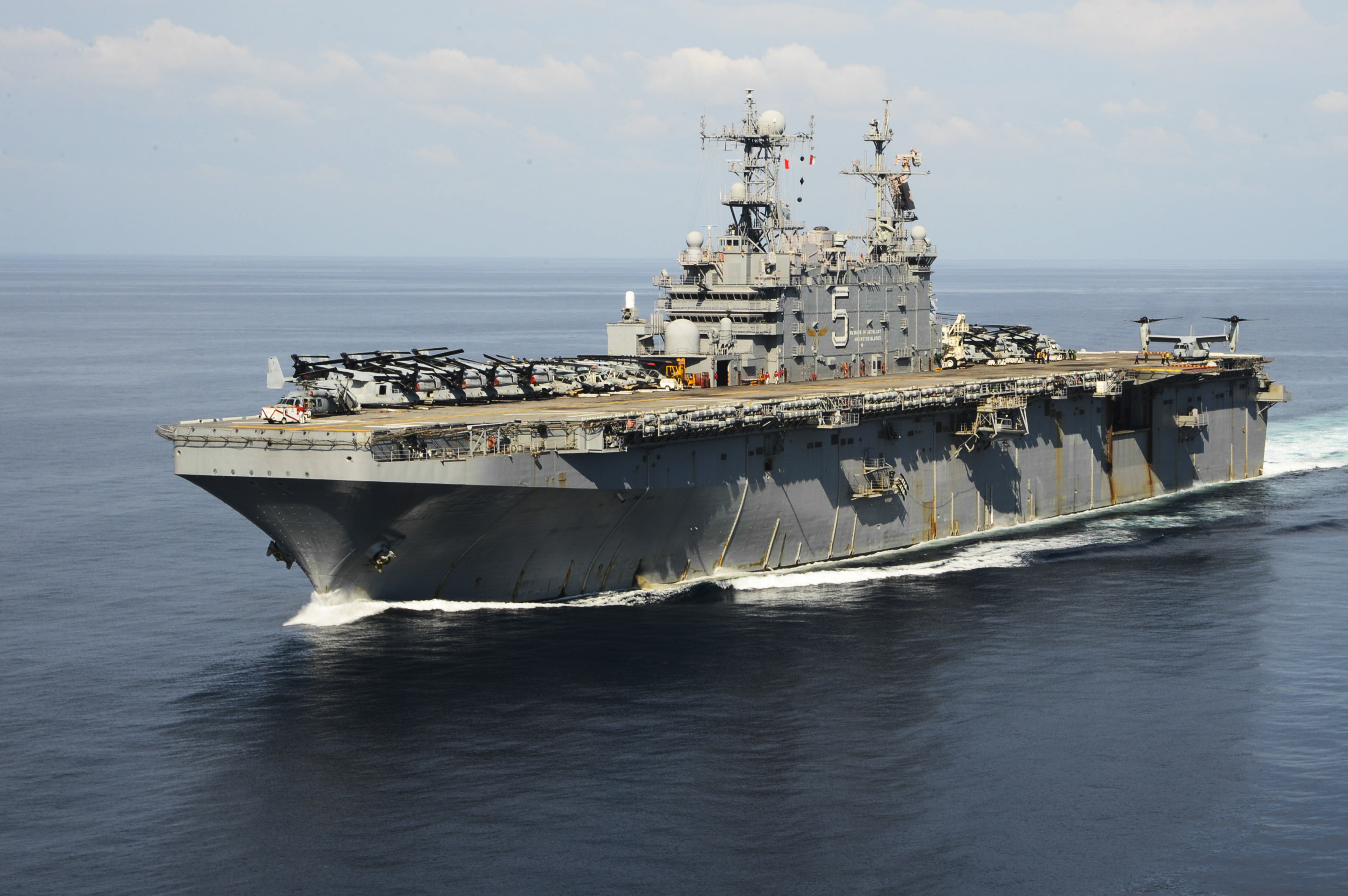
Peleliu in the Philippine Sea, October 2014.

In February 2014, the United States Pacific Fleet announced that USS Green Bay would be forward deployed to replace the decommissioned USS Denver in Japan. Peleliu deployed to the Western Pacific to mitigate the gap in amphibious presence. The ship visited numerous ports including, Apra Harbor, Guam; Sasebo and Okinawa, Japan; Subic Bay, Philippines and Singapore. During the visits, Peleliu competed against partner nation teams during various sporting events and participated in community relations projects.

Over the course of deployment, Peleliu transited more than 25,000 nautical miles (46,000 km; 29,000 mi), conducted the safe launch and recovery of more than 50 Landing Craft Utility, 30 Landing Craft Air Cushion, and 25 Amphibious Assault Vehicle ship to shore movements, as well as carrier and deck landing qualifications and operations for U.S. Navy and Marine Corps aircraft squadrons, U.S. Army 160th Special Operations Aviation Regiment (Airborne) and foreign aircraft from Colombia, Peru, Mexico and Argentina.

Upon assignment to Seventh Fleet, the ship embarked Commander, Amphibious Force Seventh Fleet, Commander, Amphibious Squadron 11 and 31st Marine Expeditionary Unit and joined USS Germantown to form the Peleliu Amphibious Readiness Group (ARG). While deployed, the ARG conducted security and stability operations and exercises throughout the Indo-Asia-Pacific region to include Amphibious Landing Exercise (PHIBLEX) 15 and other maritime cooperation exercises with partner nations.

From June to August 2014, Peleliu, with Amphibious Squadron Three, Special Purpose Marine Task Force Three and Helicopter Sea Combat Squadron (HSC) 21 embarked, participated in Rim of the Pacific (RIMPAC) 2014 as part of the Third Fleet.

== Decommissioning ==
Peleliu returned to Naval Base San Diego on 24 December 2014 from her final six-month deployment to the Western Pacific. Upon return, the ship made preparations to decommission in March 2015 after 34 years of service, 17 deployments and more than 1.6 million kilometres (990,000 miles) transited.

Peleliu was decommissioned on 31 March 2015 in San Diego. Following her decommissioning, the 820 ft-long vessel was moved to Pearl Harbor to join the reserve fleet. Ex-Peleliu was placed in an inactive reserve status and moored alongside her sister ship Tarawa.. Ex-Peleliu was struck April 30, 2024 and was moored at NAVSEA Inactive Ships On-site Maintenance Office, Pearl Harbor, Hawaii pending final disposal. On July 17, 2026, ex-Peleliu was sunk during RIMPAC2026.

== Ship's coat of arms ==
The stars across the top of the shield represent the eight Medal of Honor recipients from the Battle of Peleliu Island in 1944. Centered is the large Roman numeral "V", which represents the hull number of the ship, LHA-5. The four-point star in the "V" identifies the four functions of the landing force, and sustain their operations ashore. In the lower left-hand side of the shield is a ring, which by tradition of heraldry, symbolizes the fifth born. The 1st Marine Division emblem is the constellation Southern Cross with the numeral '1' superimposed.
