= USS Green Bay (LPD-20) =

US Navy amphibious transport ship

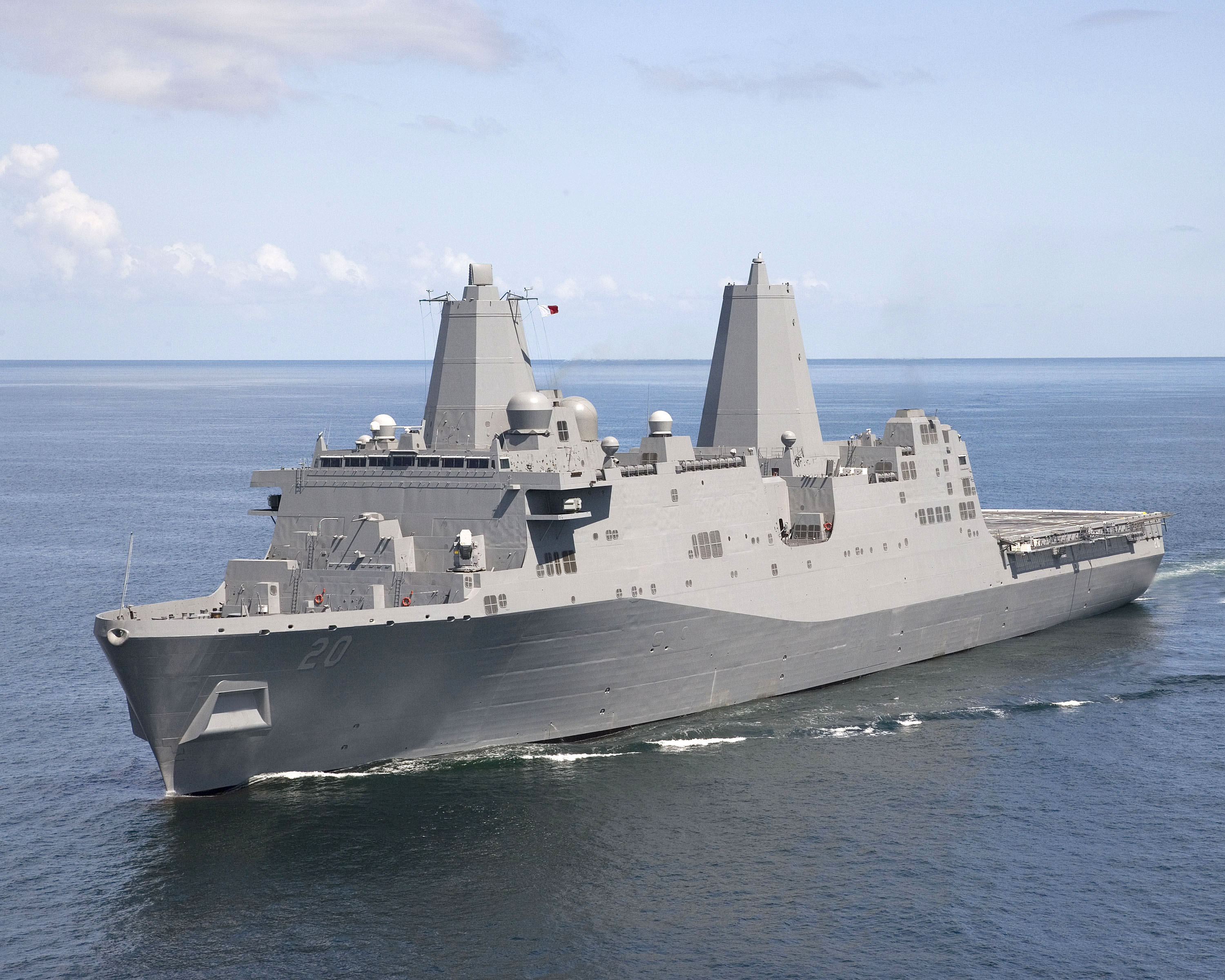
- USS Green Bay on 1 December 2008

History

United States
- Name: Green Bay
- Namesake: Green Bay
- Ordered: 30 May 2000
- Builder: Northrop Grumman Ship Systems
- Laid down: 11 August 2003
- Christened: 15 July 2006
- Launched: 11 August 2006
- Acquired: 29 August 2008
- Commissioned: 24 January 2009
- Home port: San Diego
- Identification: MMSI number: 369970636; Callsign: NGRB; Pennant number: LPD-20
- Motto: Statum Bello Invictus Maneo; (Stand and Fight, Remain Unvanquished)
- Status: in active service
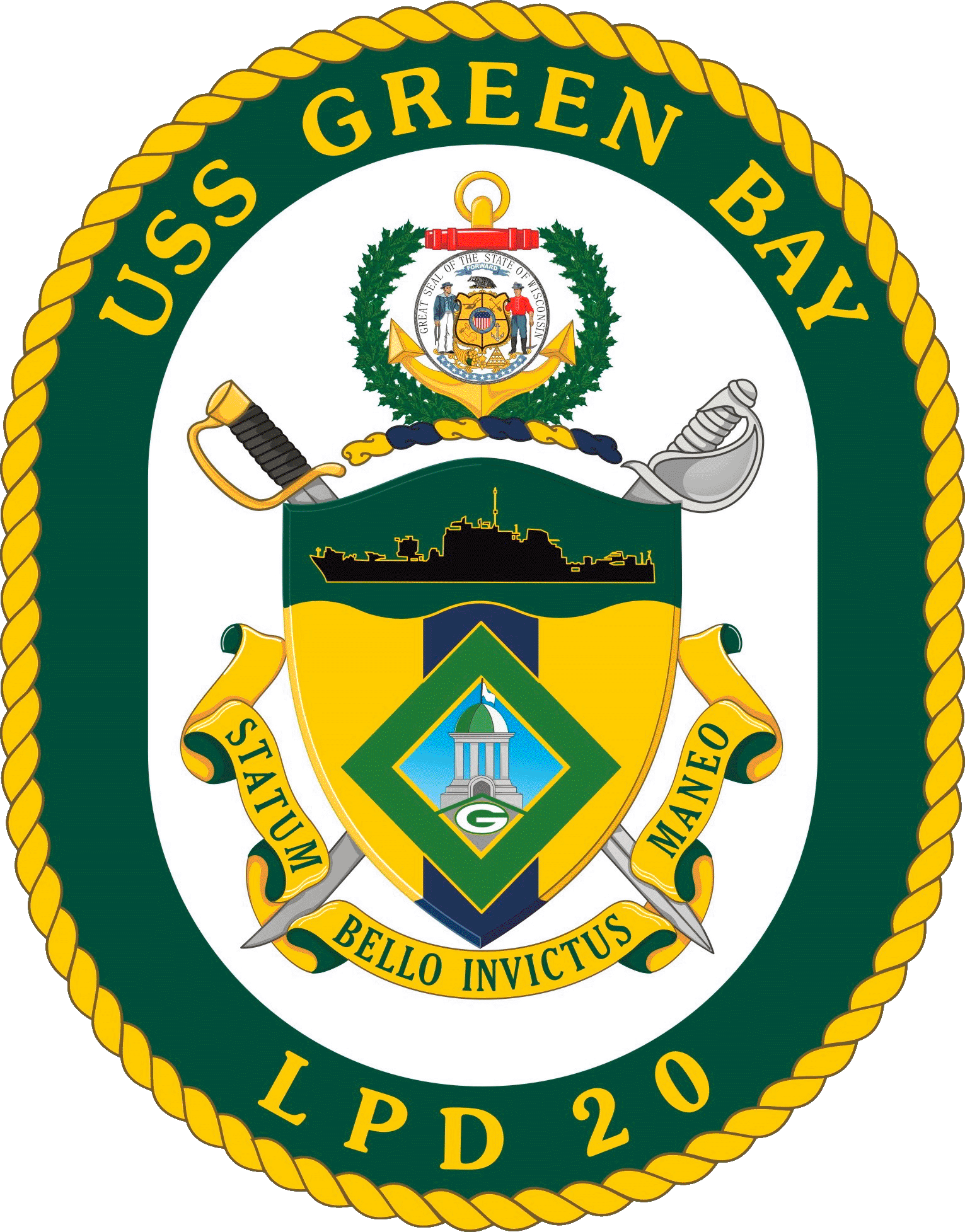
- Badge

General characteristics
- Class & type: San Antonio-class amphibious transport dock
- Displacement: 25,000 tons full
- Length: 208.5 m (684 ft 1 in) overall; 201.4 m (660 ft 9 in) waterline
- Beam: 31.9 m (104 ft 8 in) extreme; 29.5 m (96 ft 9 in) waterline
- Draft: 7.0 m (23 ft 0 in)
- Propulsion: 4 × Colt-Pielstick diesel engines; 2 × shafts, 40,000 hp (29,828 kW)
- Speed: 22 knots (41 km/h)
- Boats & landing craft carried: 2 × Landing Craft Air Cushions; or 1 × Landing Craft Utility
- Capacity: 700 (66 officers, 633 enlisted Marines); with a surge to 800 total.
- Complement: 28 officers, 332 enlisted sailors
- Armament: 2 × 30 mm Bushmaster II cannon; 2 × Rolling Airframe Missile launchers
- Aircraft carried: 4 × CH-46 Sea Knight helicopters or 2 × MV-22 Osprey tilt-rotor aircraft may be launched or recovered simultaneously, with many more than this carried.

USS Green Bay (LPD-20) is a San Antonio-class amphibious transport dock. She is the second ship of the United States Navy to be named for the city and bay of Green Bay, Wisconsin.

The contract to build her was awarded to Northrop Grumman Ship Systems of New Orleans, Louisiana, on 30 May 2000 and her keel was laid down on 11 August 2003. Green Bay was christened on 15 July 2006 and commissioned on 24 January 2009. Rose Magnus, the wife of Assistant Commandant of the Marine Corps General Robert Magnus, served as the ship's sponsor. Green Bay is assigned to the U.S. Pacific Fleet, and her home port was Naval Base San Diego, until 2015 when she was forward deployed to United States Fleet Activities Sasebo in Sasebo, Nagasaki, Japan. This deployment ended in 2024.

The ship's name has resulted in a close connection to the people of Green Bay, Wisconsin, and their professional football team, the Green Bay Packers. The ship's flight deck is named "Lambeau Field" after the name of the Packers' stadium. Green Bay businesses and residents presented the ship with a truckload of Packerland memorabilia for her 2009 commissioning.

== AV-8B Harrier testing ==
In 2009, Air Test and Evaluation Squadron 31 (VX-31) and Green Bay tested the feasibility of using the San Antonio-class LPDs for AV-8B Harrier IIs V/STOL attack aircraft in emergency situations. The AV-8Bs were used in numerous tests for the San Antonio-class's aviation certification, as well testing the effect of exhaust heat on the flight deck.

== Service history ==
The ship went on her first deployment in February 2011 with the three-ship Boxer Amphibious Ready Group. The group, comprising 4,000 sailors and Marines from the 13th Marine Expeditionary Unit, deployed for seven months to the United States Fifth and Seventh Fleet areas in the Asian region.

In March 2011, Green Bay was scheduled to assisted in Operation Tomodachi, the relief efforts after the massive 2011 Tōhoku earthquake and tsunami struck Japan. She was instead rerouted into Operation Enduring Freedom areas and never made it to Japan.

In May 2013, Green Bay returned from an eight-month deployment to the Middle East and Asia as part of the Peleliu Amphibious Ready Group, along with the 15th Marine Expeditionary Unit.

In January 2015, Green Bay was forward deployed to the 7th Fleet replacing USS Denver in the Bonhomme Richard Amphibious Ready Group homeported at United States Fleet Activities Sasebo.

On 5 August 2017, a U.S. Marine Corps MV-22 Osprey struck Green Bay after taking off from USS Bonhomme Richard. The aircraft then crashed in Shoalwater Bay on the east coast of Australia. 23 personnel were rescued, with three confirmed dead.

In May 2022, Green Bay was a part of the USS America Amphibious Ready Group in Sasebo.

On December 9, 2024, Green Bay was reassigned to San Diego for its new homeport. This shift complies with the National Defense Authorization Act (NDAA), requiring that U.S. Navy ships not be permanently forward deployed to Japan for more than 10 years.
