= Kathleen Byerly =

US Navy officer (1944–2020)

Kathleen M. Bruyere
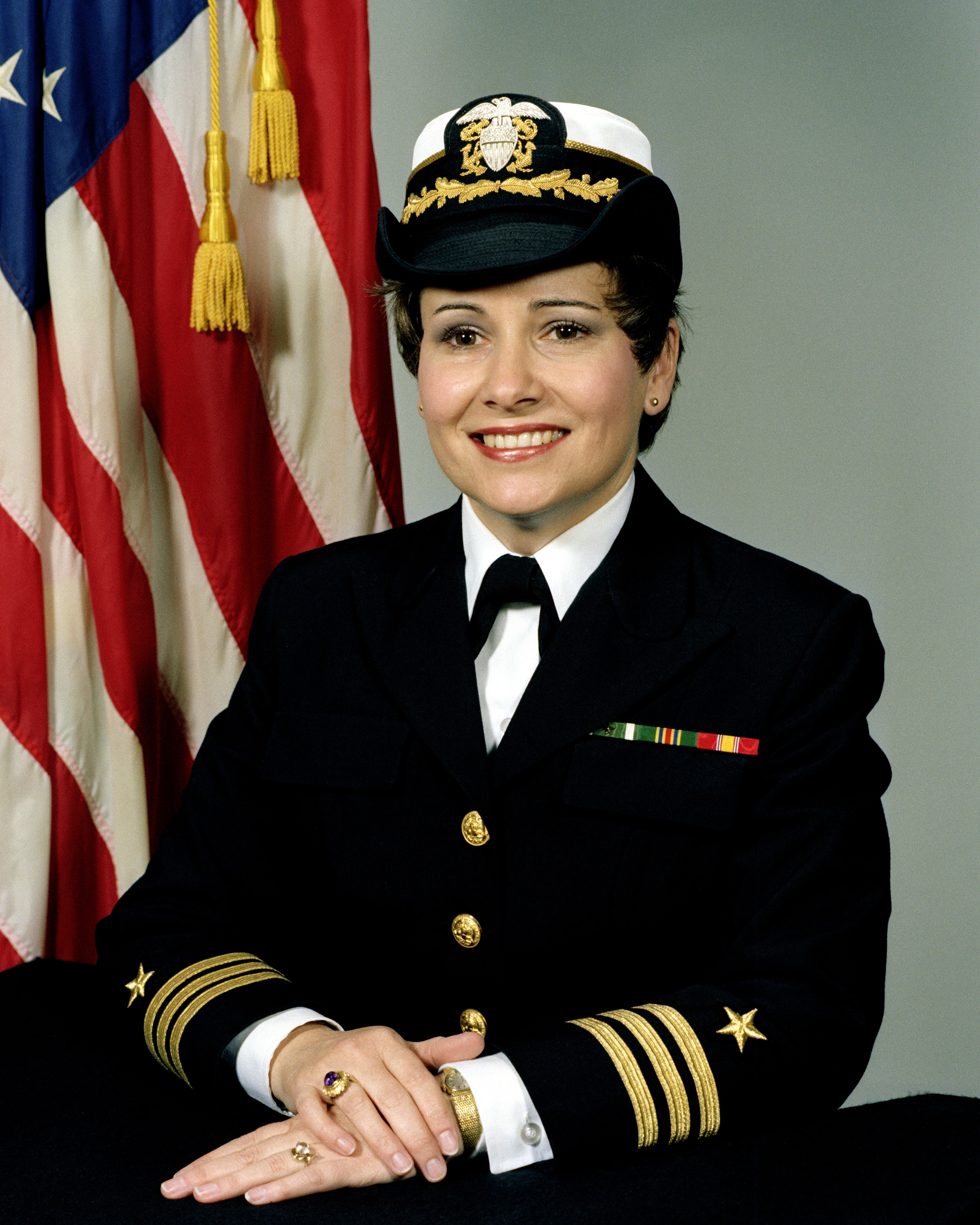
- Bruyere as a commander (1983)
- Born: Kathleen Mae Donahue; 5 February 1944; Norfolk, Virginia, U.S.
- Died: 3 September 2020 (aged 76); San Diego, California, U.S.
- Burial place: Miramar National Cemetery, San Diego, California
- Other name: Kathleen Mae Byerly
- Military career
- Allegiance: United States
- Branch: United States Navy
- Service years: 1966–1994
- Rank: Captain

Kathleen Mae Bruyere (née Donahue, previously Byerly; 5 February 1944 – 3 September 2020) was a captain in the United States Navy. She was one of the twelve women named by Time magazine as Time Person of the Year in 1975, representing American women (at the height of the feminist movement). In May 1975, she became the first female officer in the Navy to serve as the flag secretary to an admiral commanding an operational staff. In 1977, Byerly was one of six officers who sued the United States Secretary of the Navy and the United States Secretary of Defense over their being restricted from serving on combat aircraft and ships. This led to the 1948 Women's Armed Services Integration Act being struck down as unconstitutional.

== Early life ==
Kathleen Mae Donahue was born in Norfolk, Virginia, on 5 February 1944, the oldest of six children of Joseph Donahue, an Army officer, and his wife Lucille née Alessandroni. She had four brothers: Joseph, Paul, Timothy and Matthew, and a sister, Lucia. The family moved frequently as her father moved from assignment to assignment in the United States, Germany and Greece. She attended Cathedral High School, a Catholic school for girls in Trenton, NJ while her father was stationed at Fort Dix, but completed her high school education in Germany. She entered Chestnut Hill College, from which she graduated in 1966.

== Navy career ==
Following graduation, she joined the United States Navy. In 1968, she married Kellie Byerly, a fellow naval officer. Most women resigned on getting married, but she defied the convention of the time and remained on active duty. In May 1975, she held the rank of lieutenant commander, and was a Navy executive and aide to Rear Admiral Allen E. Hill. She was the first female officer in the Navy to serve as the flag secretary to an admiral commanding an operational staff. Byerly was one of the twelve women named by Time magazine as Time Person of the Year for 1975, and featured on the cover. While WAVES had served on flag officers' staffs before, her role was far more important. She headed the admiral's staff, and had the responsibility for dealing with the nine Pacific training commands.

In 1977, Byerly was one of six officers who sued the United States Secretary of the Navy and the United States Secretary of Defense, arguing that their prospects for promotion had been unfairly limited by their inability to go to sea on ships. Under the 1948, Women's Armed Services Integration Act, the service secretaries had the right to discharge women without cause, and women were restricted from flying combat aircraft or serving on ships that might one day have to engage in combat. One of her fellow plaintiffs, a pilot, was told that she could deliver supplies to a ship, but not land on it. In 1978, United States District Judge John Sirica ruled that the law was unconstitutional, clearing the way for women to serve. The ruling opened up 9,000 jobs at sea to women. Perhaps as importantly, it gave women the opportunity to command ships.

Byerly did not get to serve on a warship, but she was eventually promoted to captain. She became the special assistant to the Chief of Naval Operations for women's policy, and helped prepare a 1987 study on sexism and career opportunities for women in the Navy. The following year she became the New York Recruiting District's first ever female executive officer. While there she met Thomas Bruyere, another fellow naval officer. She divorced her first husband and married Bruyere in 1988. Through her second marriage, she acquired three stepsons. In June 1991, she assumed command of the Orlando Naval Recruit Training Command in Orlando, Florida. It had been criticized for the manner in which it had handled allegations of rape and sexual harassment, and it was slated for closure. Under her command, training of its 30,000 enlistees a year was integrated.

== Later life ==
Bruyere retired from the Navy in 1994 and moved to Chula Vista, California. She cared for her husband, who had Parkinson's disease, until his death in 2009. She was on the boards of the local chapters of the Parkinson's Association, the Alzheimer's Association, the George G. Glenner Center for Memory Care and Caregiver Support, and the Military Officers Association of America. She died from cancer in Paradise Valley Hospital in San Diego on 3 September 2020. Her remains were interred in Miramar National Cemetery, where she had worked for many years as a volunteer.

== Legacy ==
In 2022, Bruyere became the subject of the documentary Time for Change: The Kathy Bruyere Story directed by filmmaker and veteran Daniel L. Bernardi. The documentary received lots of critical attention and it screened at the opening night of the 2023 GI Film Festival San Diego, where it won the Best Short Documentary award. Time for Change: The Kathy Bruyere Story opened the film festival alongside another documentary of women in the military directed by Daniel Bernardi, a feature film centred on Army nurse Jennifer Moreno titled: Ultimate Sacrifices Cpt. Jennifer Moreno.
