= Operation Distant Runner =

US operation to evacuate civilians

Operation Distant Runner was a US military operation involving the evacuation of non-combatants from Rwanda in 1994 during the Rwandan Genocide. Executed from April 7 until April 18, 1994, the operation was entirely successful and resulted in no marine casualties.

In early April 1994, President Bill Clinton informed the US Congress of possible non-combatant evacuation (NEO) operations from Rwanda as US military forces were deployed to Burundi in preparation. The operation finally commenced with the deployment of US Marine Corps marine air-ground task force (MAGTAF) units, including the 2nd Battalion, 5th Marines, part of the broader 11th Marine Expeditionary Unit (Special Operations Capable). Using aerial refueling from the VMGR-352, three CH-53E helicopters made the 750-mile journey from the USS Peleliu towards the capital of Burundi - Bujumbura.

Upon arrival, the US marines coordinated the evacuation of non-combatants, including 142 US nationals and a diplomat, from Rwanda. By the end of the operation, a total of 241 civilians had been rescued.

Participants in Operation Distant Runner are qualified to receive the Navy Expeditionary Medal, as the operation saw both Navy and Marine Corps personnel engaging in foreign territory to provide humanitarian assistance and evacuate civilians from war.
