= USS Denver (LPD-9) =

Austin-class amphibious transport dock

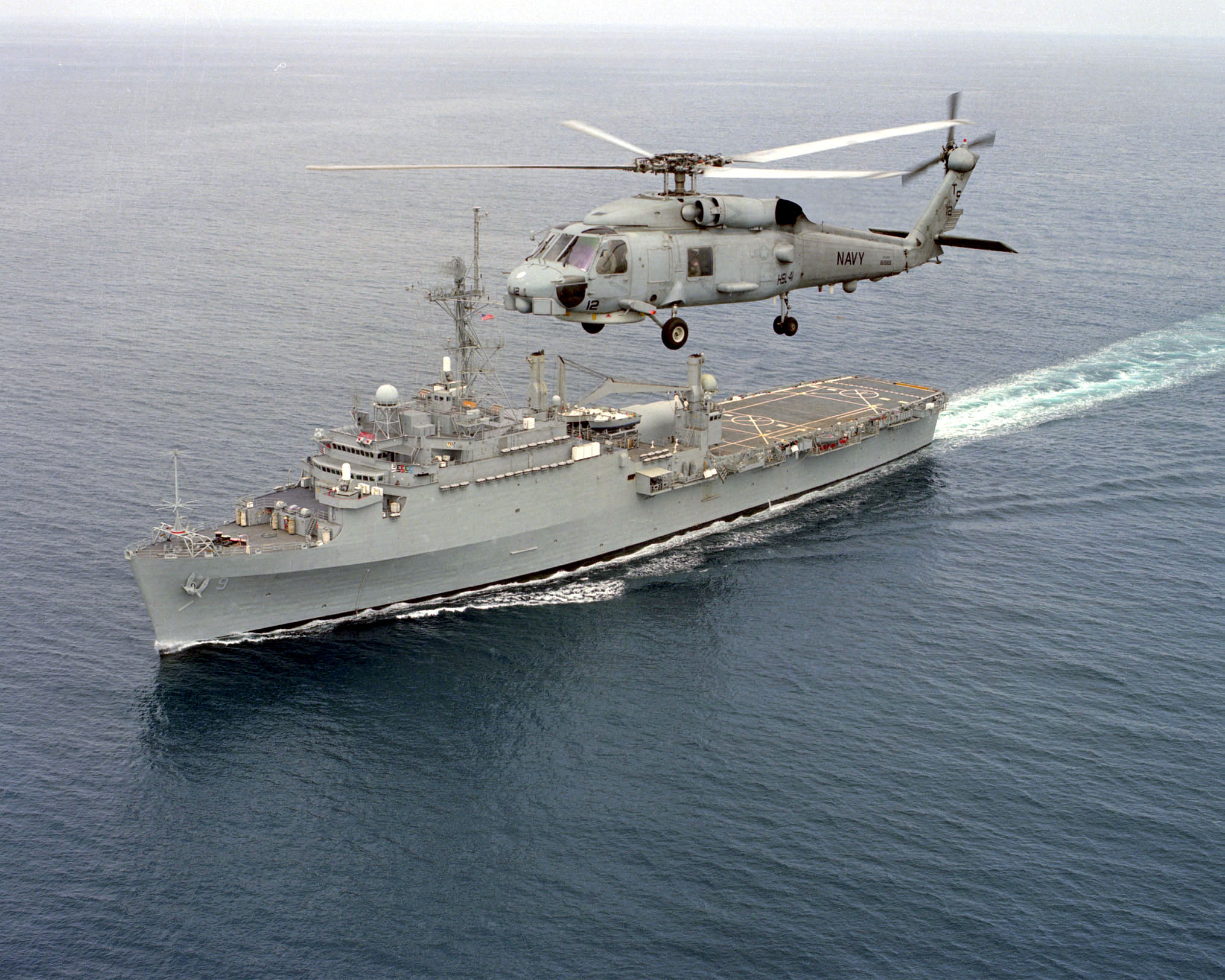
- USS Denver in September 1997

History

United States
- Name: Denver
- Namesake: City of Denver, Colorado
- Awarded: 23 May 1963
- Builder: Lockheed Shipbuilding
- Laid down: 7 July 1964
- Launched: 23 January 1965
- Commissioned: 26 October 1968
- Decommissioned: 14 August 2014
- Stricken: 13 November 2017
- Identification: Hull number: LPD-9
- Fate: Sunk as target, 22 July 2022
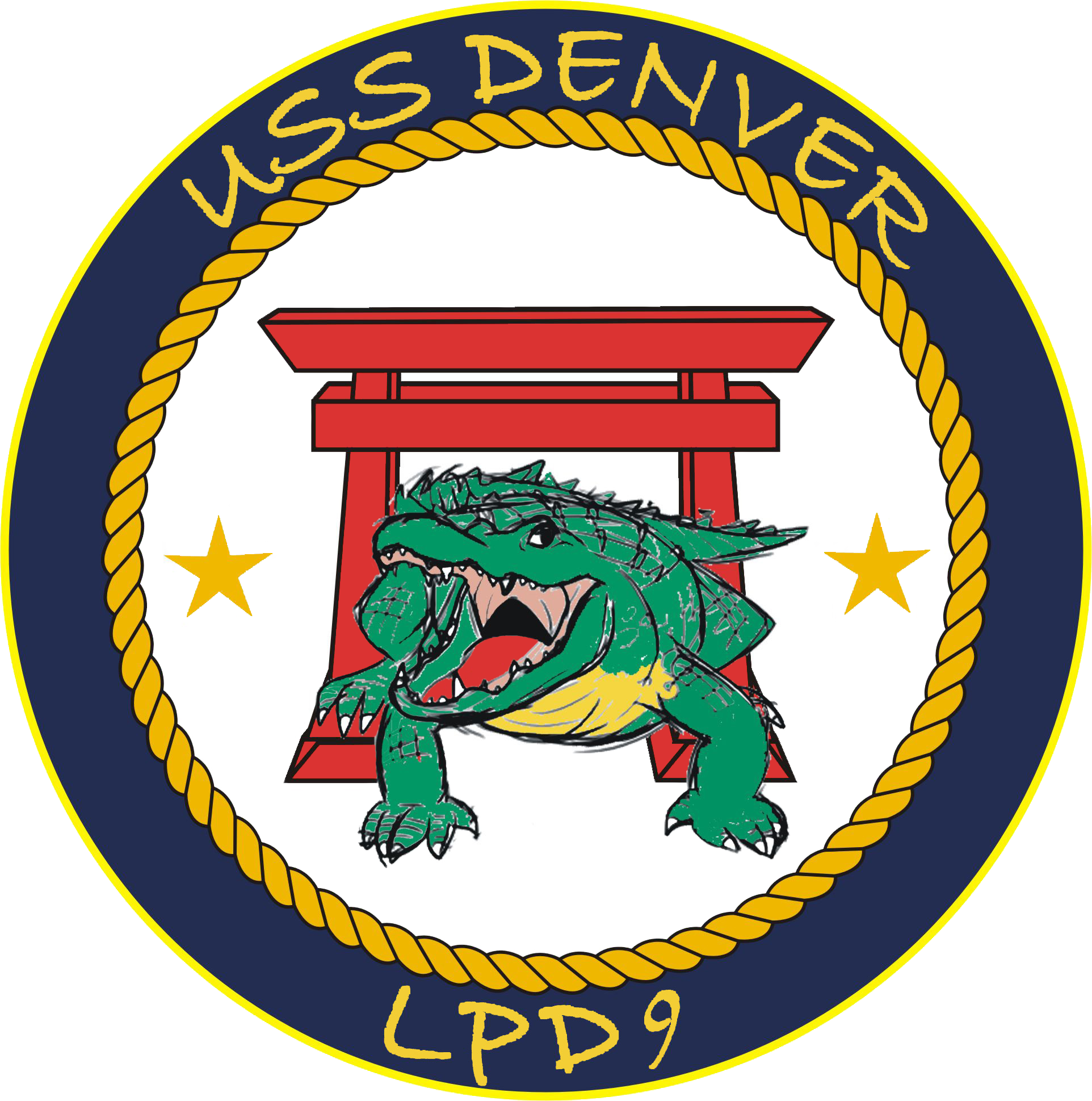
- Badge

General characteristics
- Class & type: Austin-class amphibious transport dock
- Tonnage: 9,687 tons
- Displacement: 17,425 tons
- Length: 561 ft 0 in (171 m) overall
- Beam: 82 ft 8 in (25.2 m)
- Propulsion: 2 × 600 lb. Babcock & Wilcox D Type boilers, two steam turbines, two shafts, 24,000 shp (18,000 kW)
- Speed: 21 knots (39 km/h; 24 mph)
- Complement: 24 officers, 396 enlisted, 900 marines
- Armament: 2 × 25 mm Mk 38 guns; 2 × Phalanx CIWS; 8 × .50-caliber (12.7 mm) machine guns
- Aircraft carried: Up to six CH-46 Sea Knight helicopters

USS Denver (LPD-9), an Austin-class amphibious transport dock, was the third ship of United States Navy to bear this name. Denver's keel was laid on 7 July 1964 at Lockheed Shipbuilding and Construction Company, Seattle, Washington. She was launched on 23 January 1965, christened by Mrs. Ann Daniels Love, wife of John A. Love, the former governor of Colorado, and commissioned on 26 October 1968. After 46 years of service, Denver was decommissioned at Joint Base Pearl Harbor–Hickam on 14 August 2014. At the time of her decommissioning, Denver was the oldest deployable warship in the U.S. Navy, and was one of the last active warships to have served in Vietnam.

== History ==
=== Vietnam War ===
In 1970, Denver played a key role in the SS Columbia Eagle incident. When Columbia Eagle was commandeered by two mutinous crew members on 14 March 1970, Denver was immediately dispatched to intercept and recapture Columbia Eagle. Denver never really caught up with Columbian Eagle, and sat outside the 12-mile (19 km) limits of Cambodia (to where Columbia Eagle had been diverted) for a few days then departed the area.

On 21 July 1972 United States Marine Corps AH-1 helicopters operating from Denver attacked North Vietnamese barges 30 miles (48 km) north-northwest of Đồng Hới.

In April 1975, Denver participated in Operation Frequent Wind, the evacuation of Saigon, South Vietnam.

=== Post-Vietnam through 1990s ===
In December 1979, Denver participated in the filming of the motion picture Raise the Titanic based on the novel authored by Clive Cussler.

On 3 September 1993, Denver left her home port of San Diego and deployed with 900 Marines and a platoon from Seal Team 5 to support operations in Somalia as part of United Nations Operation in Somalia II (UNOSOM II).

=== Collision with USNS Yukon ===
On 13 July 2000, the ship was participating in a refueling exercise near the end of a deployment. Denver, off the coast of Oahu, collided with its refueling vessel, USNS Yukon. Denver's bow was seriously damaged. It remained in port at Pearl Harbor undergoing repairs for two weeks. An investigation into the accident found Denver responsible.

=== 2000s and 2010s ===
In 2008, Denver replaced USS Juneau. The crew from Juneau took all relevant gear and documents from Juneau and transferred them to Denver. Denver was then home-ported at Sasebo Naval Base, Japan, where she remained until being decommissioned.

Beginning on 17 August 2009, Denver started rendering humanitarian assistance to Taiwan due to the destruction caused by Typhoon Morakot. Denver was tasked independently to render aid with two embarked squadrons, HM-14 and HSC-25.

Cooperating closely with Taiwan Army and Air Force, they were supporting efforts by airlifting food, medical supplies, and providing heavy lift support for earth moving equipment to assist with recovery efforts. Due to the sensitive nature surrounding Taiwan, especially with the One China policy, the Department of Defense did not publicly announce relief efforts. Denver was planned to be in the vicinity of Taiwan until 22 August 2009 to render aid to the people of Taiwan. Denver had just completed the exercise Talisman Saber 2009 and was on her way to her homeport when she was directly tasked with this humanitarian mission.

Denver was also sent to Sumatra to assist in the recovery efforts following the earthquakes there in September 2009.

During the 2010 Fall Patrol, from 1 September to 25 November 2010, Denver accompanied USS Essex and USS Harpers Ferry on a tour of Southeast Asia. During the patrol, Denver took part in the 60th anniversary of the invasion of Incheon, Korea and assisted the Philippines in the wake of Typhoon Megi. On 17 November, Denver and Essex became the first U.S. warships to visit Hong Kong's Victoria Harbour in more than two years.

The ship departed Sasebo in September 2011 for a patrol of the western Pacific. Accompanying the ship were USS Germantown and USS Essex.

In fall 2012, Denver departed for the 31st MEU fall patrol. During certification exercises around Guam, Denver's boilers suffered severe damage. After three weeks of repair at Guam, Denver left to continue patrol. Denver finished the patrol with limited power.

=== Decommissioning ===
Denver was decommissioned on 14 August 2014 at Joint Base Pearl Harbor–Hickam in Hawaii. She had been the oldest active duty ship in the US Navy behind USS Constitution. Upon Denver's decommissioning, USS Blue Ridge became the Navy's second oldest ship. The US government had offered to sell the ship to Malaysia to replace KD Sri Inderapura which was destroyed by fire in an incident in 2009.

The Navy announced that USS Green Bay would replace Denver in Sasebo in the summer of 2015.

On 22 July 2022, Denver was sunk during a sinking exercise (SINKEX), as part of a multinational exercise Rim of the Pacific (RIMPAC) 2022, approximately 50 nautical miles (93 km; 58 mi) northwest of Kauai, Hawaii. She was hit by U.S. Navy F/A-18F Super Hornets launching long-range anti-ship missiles; United States Army AH-64 Apache helicopters shot air-to-ground Hellfire missiles, rockets, and 30 mm guns; and Marine Corps F/A-18C/D Hornets fired AGM-88 HARM missiles, followed by a Harpoon (AGM-84) missile, and JDAMs. She was also shelled by USS Chafee with her Mark 45 5-inch (130 mm) gun, Japanese Self Defence Force Type 12 surface-to-ship missiles and the U.S. Army's High Mobility Artillery Rocket System, sinking her in 15,000 feet (4,600 m) of water in the Pacific Ocean.

Preceded by USS Enterprise (CVN-65)	Oldest active combat ship of the United States Navy; 2012–2014	Succeeded by USS Blue Ridge (LCC-19)
