= University of San Francisco School of Nursing and Health Professions =

Nursing school in San Francisco, California

Coordinates: 37°46′33.26″N 122°27′2.87″W

University of San Francisco
- Motto: Change the World from Here
- Type: Private, Jesuit
- Established: 1954
- Students: approx. 1,300 students (August 2024)
- Location: San Francisco, California, United States
- Campus: Urban
- Colors: Green and Gold
- Mascot: The Don
- Website: www.usfca.edu/nursing

The University of San Francisco School of Nursing and Health Professions (SONHP) is the nursing school of the University of San Francisco, located in San Francisco, California. The school has approximately 1,300 students. 90 percent of BSN graduates from 2022 to 2024 passed the NCLEX the first time and 92 percent of Masters-entry MSN graduates from 2022 to 2024 passed the NCLEX the first time.

== History ==
Founded by the Sisters of Mercy in 1954.

== Campus ==
The school is located in Cowell Hall on the 51-acre (210,000 m^{2}) hilltop USF campus overlooking Golden Gate Park, the Pacific Ocean and downtown San Francisco. Cowell Hall is located on the main campus, entrance from Golden Gate Avenue between Kittredge Terrace and Roselyn Terrace; Cowell Hall is behind the Harney Science Center and the University Center.

The school works in conjunction with many of the hospitals in the San Francisco Bay Area to provide clinical training for students.

There is a skills laboratory on the first floor of Cowell Hall which provides an environment in which students can practice their skills and clinical decision making. There is also a state of the art simulation center located on the main campus. The simulation center provides opportunities for students to work in teams to acquire clinical judgment and develop in the professional nursing role.

Beyond the San Francisco campus, the school offers master's-level programs at USF's regional campuses in Sacramento and Orange County.

== Academics ==
The school has over 1,300 students enrolled in eight degree programs. Each degree incorporates the Jesuit mission and values with program outcomes focused on working with underserved populations.

=== Undergraduate degrees ===
The school offers a BSN program leading to licensure as a registered nurse (RN). Starting in Fall 2023, the school offers a Bachelor of Science in Public Health (BSPH) degree which aims to train students for successful careers as public health professionals.

=== Postgraduate degrees ===
The Master of Science in Nursing for Non-Nurses (MSN for Non-Nurses) program is designed for students who hold bachelor's degrees in areas of study outside of nursing and are seeking new careers as registered nurses. Conversely, the Master of Science in Nursing for Registered Nurses is the pathway of the MSN program that prepares RNs already holding an associate's or bachelor's degree in nursing to advance within the field. The MSN degree has a Clinical Nurse Leader (CNL) focus. The MSN program for Registered Nurses is available to students online.

The school also offers a Master of Public Health (MPH) program and a Master of Science in Digital Health Informatics (MSHI).

The Doctor of Nursing Practice (DNP) is a practice-focused doctorate. Graduates are prepared as nurse practitioners (direct advanced practice), psychiatric and mental health nurse practitioners or healthcare system leaders (indirect advanced practice). Nurses with either the BSN or those who have already earned the MSN can pursue the degree. Starting in Fall 2024 the University of San Francisco offers a DNP in Health Systems Leadership with opportunities to focus in Education and Simulation, Management, or Population Health Leadership. The Doctor of Psychology (PsyD) prepares graduates to work as psychologists, with a focus on practice in lieu of research.

== Admissions ==
The School has a different start term for each program based on campus location. It is important to check with the Office of Undergraduate or Graduate Admission for specific start terms and application deadlines for each program. If you have questions regarding the admissions process, start term, or campus location, you should contact the Admission Office.

== Student life ==
In addition to the USF's student life that engages students across all fields of study, the School of Nursing and Health Professions has various student organizations which provide both graduates and undergraduates with opportunities to become involved in school matters, university life, state- and nationwide professional organizations and community service unique to students studying in the School of Nursing and Health Professions which include: Nursing Student Association (NSA), Sigma Theta Tau International Honor Society of Nursing: Beta Gamma Chapter, Tri Gamma Nursing Society, MSNS (Previously Male Student Nursing Society), Nursing Student Multicultural Interest Group and Masters in Public Health Student Association (MPHSA). Networking and mentorship programs are also available for students both undergraduate and graduate that connect them with alumni, faculty and members of the wider community. Students also have the opportunity to participate in immersion programs that focus on nursing and healthcare in the Central Valley of California, Cambodia, Kenya, and Lesotho, among others.

Starting in 2023, the Nurse Health Equity Scholars (NHES) program promotes health equity and justice in partnership with the Alameda Health System and the San Francisco Department of Public Health. Nursing is changing its focus from merely delivering health care to developing health and eliminating health inequities. This program recognizes and equips nurses with the necessary skills to provide care tailored to the unique needs of different individuals and communities.

== Miscellaneous ==
The baccalaureate degree program in nursing, the master's degree program in nursing, and the Doctor of Nursing Practice program at the University of San Francisco School of Nursing and Health Professions are accredited by the Commission on Collegiate Nursing Education (http://www.ccneaccreditation.org).

Students who graduate from the program are also eligible to receive the California Public Health Nursing Certificate.

Graduates meet the outcome competencies and practice standards of the American Association of Colleges of Nursing (AACN) for the DNP. In the program, students complete 1,000 hours of supervised clinical practice, complete the DNP qualifying examination, and complete an evidence-based practice project.

The USF School of Nursing and Health Professions has an overall 3-year (2022–2024), first time NCLEX pass rate of 90% among its baccalaureate graduates and 92% for its masters-entry level students.

USF nursing students provide 140,000 hours of health care services to the San Francisco Bay Area each year.

== See also ==
- List of nursing schools in the United States
