= Parkinson's Association =

Mental health care service organization

- Founded: 1983
- Type: NPO
- Location: California
- Services: Mental health services, education, support, research, physical & occupational therapy and personal training
- Website: www.parkinsonaassociation.org

The Parkinson's Association is a Southern California mental health care service organization, supports Parkinson's research and is a not-for-profit organization. The Parkinson's Association helps people with Parkinson's disease navigate the symptoms of Parkinson's through medical support programs, education, research, awareness and support. Parkinson's families are treated through managing the symptoms.

== History ==
The organization was known as the Parkinson's Association of San Diego until it expanded into the greater Los Angeles Area. It re-branded in 2013 to become the Parkinson's Association, expanding services to all of Southern California.

The Parkinson's Association offered programs and services to assist Parkinson's patients, their family members, and care partners. Parkinson's support groups are positioned throughout San Diego, Orange and Los Angeles Counties. This is a Southern California-based information and referral center, while conducting community based symposiums, workshops and services. The Parkinson's Association serves local communities with innovative health care programs including Minds and Motion Health Services. These services include direct programs to help Parkinson's families with counseling, physical and voice therapies.

The national Parkinson's magazine, Parkinsonian.org, was established in 2013. Over 38,000 subscribers, including 17,000 medical professionals across the United States, read news articles, scientific findings and health and fitness tips for families living with Parkinson's disease.

The Parkinson's Association research scientists collaborate with other research organizations on Parkinson's-specific stem cell research and disease progression projects. The stem cell research uses patients' DNA through skin fibroblasts and converts them to stem cells, then to dopamine-producing neurons. Upon approval by the FDA, these cells are intended to be implanted in patients, replacing lost neurons. The disease progression studies are based on tracking cognitive behavior therapies and mental health counseling to track changes as the patients age. Jerry Henberger retired as the executive director in June 2015. Lisa Fine assumed leadership of the organization as the executive director. In November 2016, the organization downsized and is run mostly by activists, volunteers and the board of directors. The annual Walk for Parkinson's is one of the largest Parkinson's non profit events on the west coast of California.

== Support groups ==
The Parkinson's Association provides local support groups throughout Southern California, including San Diego, Los Angeles and Orange County.

== Minds and Motion Health Services ==
The Parkinson's Association provides trained mental health specialists to help families deal with issues such as depression, anxiety, marital problems, loss and thoughts of suicide. Depression and anxiety are among the common mental health complaints of both people with Parkinson's and their families. Cognitive behavioral therapy can help patients learn to live better by teaching techniques that can help patients live better.

Minds and Motion counseling and mental health services include:

- Individual Counseling: These sessions provide a private and confidential environment for discussion of issues that may be difficult to discuss with doctors, loved ones, or even in support groups. Therapists will help clients to express, understand and explore non-motor symptoms, as well as learn effective, research based strategies for managing these symptoms in order to live a happier, healthier life, both mentally and physically.
- Family Counseling: Couples and families face unique problems and these sessions provide a safe and comfortable space for couples and/or families to discuss interpersonal issues. Sessions are aimed at understanding how family dynamics impact psychological health and developing tools to strengthen family relationships.
- Group Counseling. Group counseling sessions will encompass a variety of topics and will consist of processing difficult feelings that may arise. Examples of topics include avoiding caregiver burnout, managing conflict, dealing with grief and loss in everyday life, managing anxiety and overcoming depression.
