= Pacific Partnership =

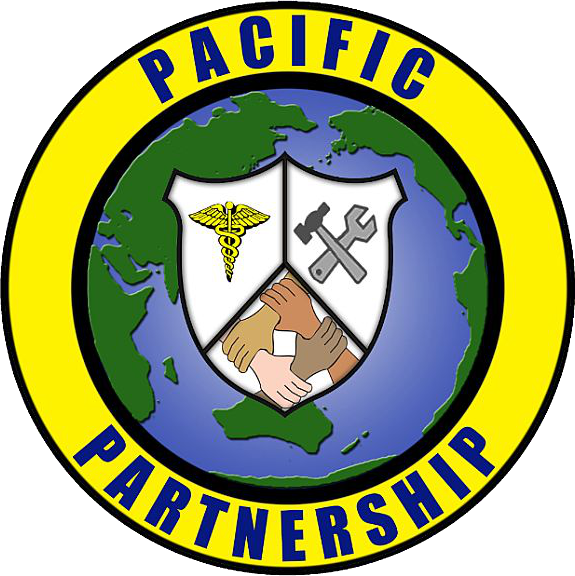
- Type: annual military exercise
- Location: Pacific Ocean
- Objective: humanitarian assistance
- Date: 2004 –
- Executed by: United States Pacific Fleet

Pacific Partnership is an annual deployment of forces from the Pacific Fleet of the United States Navy (USN), in cooperation with regional governments and military forces, along with humanitarian and non-government organizations.

The deployment was conceived following the 2004 Indian Ocean earthquake and tsunami, as a way to improve the interoperability of the region's military forces, governments, and humanitarian organisations during disaster relief operations, while providing humanitarian, medical, dental, and engineering assistance to nations of the Pacific, and strengthening relationships and security ties between the nations.

The deployment is typically based around an amphibious warfare vessel or hospital ship of the USN's Pacific Fleet. Other nations regularly contribute to the deployment; the Australian Defence Force has provided assets since the first deployment in 2006, and seven nations, along with other branches of the United States Armed Forces, US government agencies, and non-government organizations, were involved in Pacific Partnership 2011.

== History ==
Following Operation Unified Assurance, the United States response to the 2004 Indian Ocean earthquake and tsunami, the United States Navy saw the opportunity to build on the goodwill created by this operation, and conceived an annual deployment to the region. The aim of this deployment, Pacific Partnership, was to improve the interoperability of the region's military forces, governments, and humanitarian organisations during disaster relief operations, while providing humanitarian, medical, dental, and engineering assistance to nations of the Pacific, and strengthening relationships and security ties between the nations. The first such deployment was conducted in 2006, based aboard the hospital ship USNS Mercy, and included partner nations such as Australia (which has contributed consistently since), and non-government organizations. The deployment visited the Philippines, Bangladesh, Indonesia, West Timor, and East Timor.

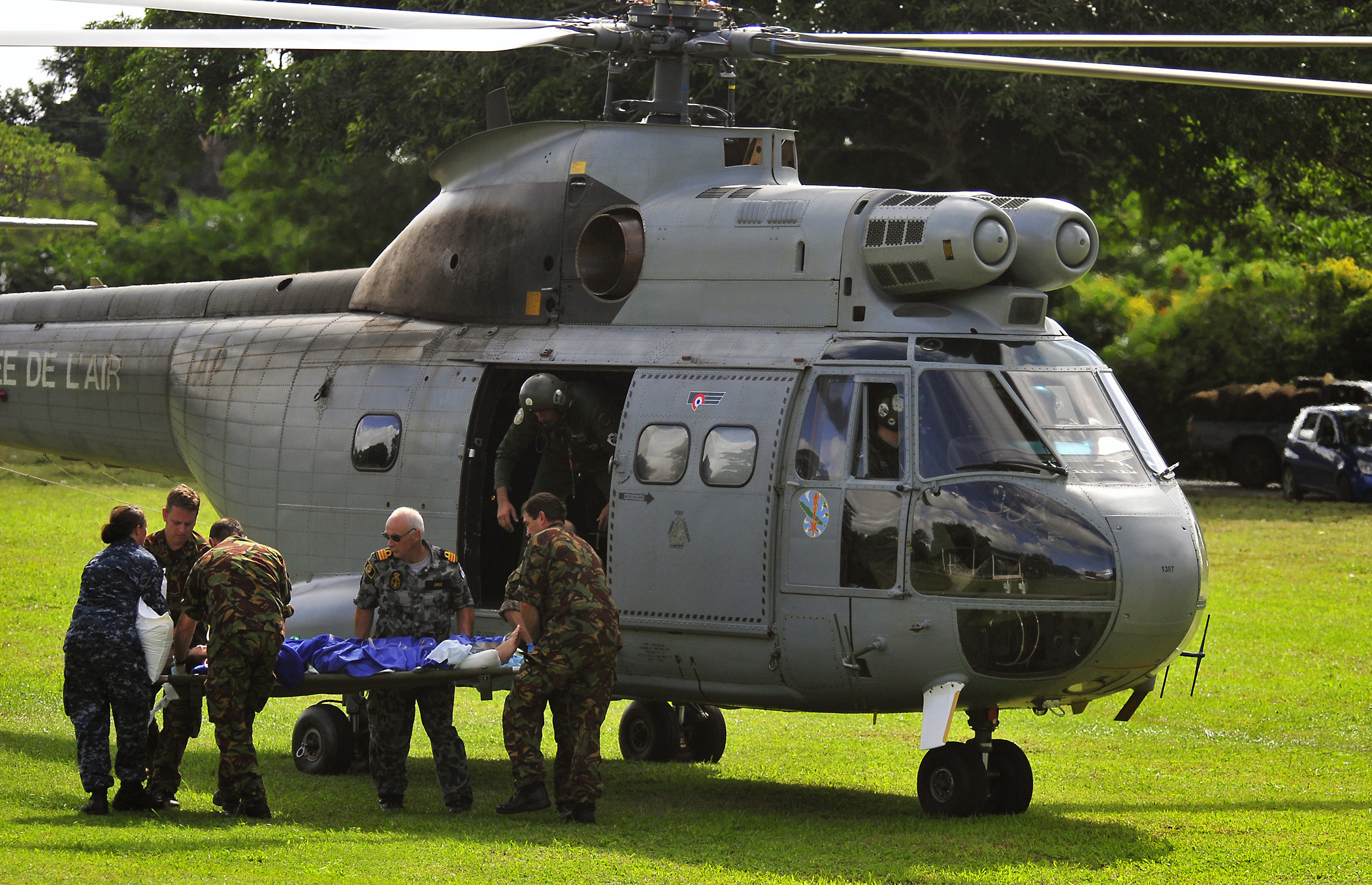
Personnel loading an injured Australian man into a French Puma helicopter during Pacific Partnership 2011

In 2007, the Pacific Fleet prepared another deployment, this time based aboard the amphibious warfare ship USS Peleliu. Nations visited included the Philippines, Vietnam, Papua New Guinea, the Solomon Islands, and the Marshall Islands. 2008 saw USNS Mercy visit the Federated States of Micronesia, Papua New Guinea, the Philippines, Timor-Leste, and Vietnam. During Pacific Partnership 2008, over 90,000 patients were treated, including 14,000 dental patients and 1,300 surgery patients. The flagship for the 2009 deployment was the dry cargo ship USNS Richard E. Bird, which visited the Oceanic nations of Kiribati, the Marshall Islands, Samoa, the Solomon Islands, and Tonga.

In 2008, the pacific Partnership sailed again on board the U.S.N.S. Mercy. Sailing from San Diego on May 1, 2008, they passed through Hawaii to the South Pacific. Pacific Partnership provided humanitarian and engineering assistance by visiting the Republic of the Philippines, Vietnam, Timor-Leste and Papua New Guinea. The Mercy returned via Guam and Hawaii, arriving in San Diego on September 25, 2008.

The USNS Mercy (T-AH 19) and her crew of U.S. military, partner-nation representatives and non-governmental organizations (NGO) arrived in Chuuk, Federated States of Micronesia, for the final mission site for Pacific Partnership 2008. This mission reflected the longstanding tie between the U.S. and Micronesia with its humanitarian outreach. During the 10 days in Micronesia the mission was carried out with the NGO's and in close coordination and partnership with local medical care professionals. Volunteers from Project Hope and the University of California at San Diego Pre-dental Society worked closely with the U.S. and partner-nation medical personnel. Several countries were represented, including Canada, India, Australia and New Zealand. The UCSD Pre-dental Society provided dentists, dental students, pre-dental students (both from several universities) medical and pre-medical students and pharmacists and pharmacy students. Military personnel as well as the NGO volunteers worked together to provide humanitarian and civic assistance to six different locations within Micronesia. The Chuuk State Hospital at Weno Island was the beneficiary of the Naval Seabees as they reconstructed the facility.

The Federated States of Micronesia (FSM) President Emanuel Mori signed into congressional law a resolution thanking the USNS Mercy (T-AH19) Pacific Partnership mission during the fifth regular session of the 15th Congress of the Federated States of Micronesia on October 29, 2008. According to a press release from the FSM Public Information Office, Congressional Resolution No. 15-145 was instituted to convey "profound gratitude and appreciation to the team of health services professionals and crew of USNS Mercy for humanitarian assistance and medical assistance to the people of Yap, Chuuk and Pohnpei during the visit to the FSM." The August 22 to September 1 visit was the fifth and final stop on Mercy's Pacific Partnership 2008 deployment which ran from May through September. During the FSM visit, Mercy and other Pacific Partnership personnel treated 3,000 dental patients, 15,000 medical patients and performed more than 200 surgeries.

Pacific Partnership returned to USNS Mercy in 2010, visiting Vietnam, Cambodia, Indonesia, and Timor-Leste. Mercy was supported at different times by ships from Japan, Indonesia, Singapore, and Australia. In addition to Mercy's operations, two separate deployments were made under Pacific Partnership 2010: the command ship USS Blue Ridge to Palau, and the heavy lift ship HMAS Tobruk to Papua New Guinea.

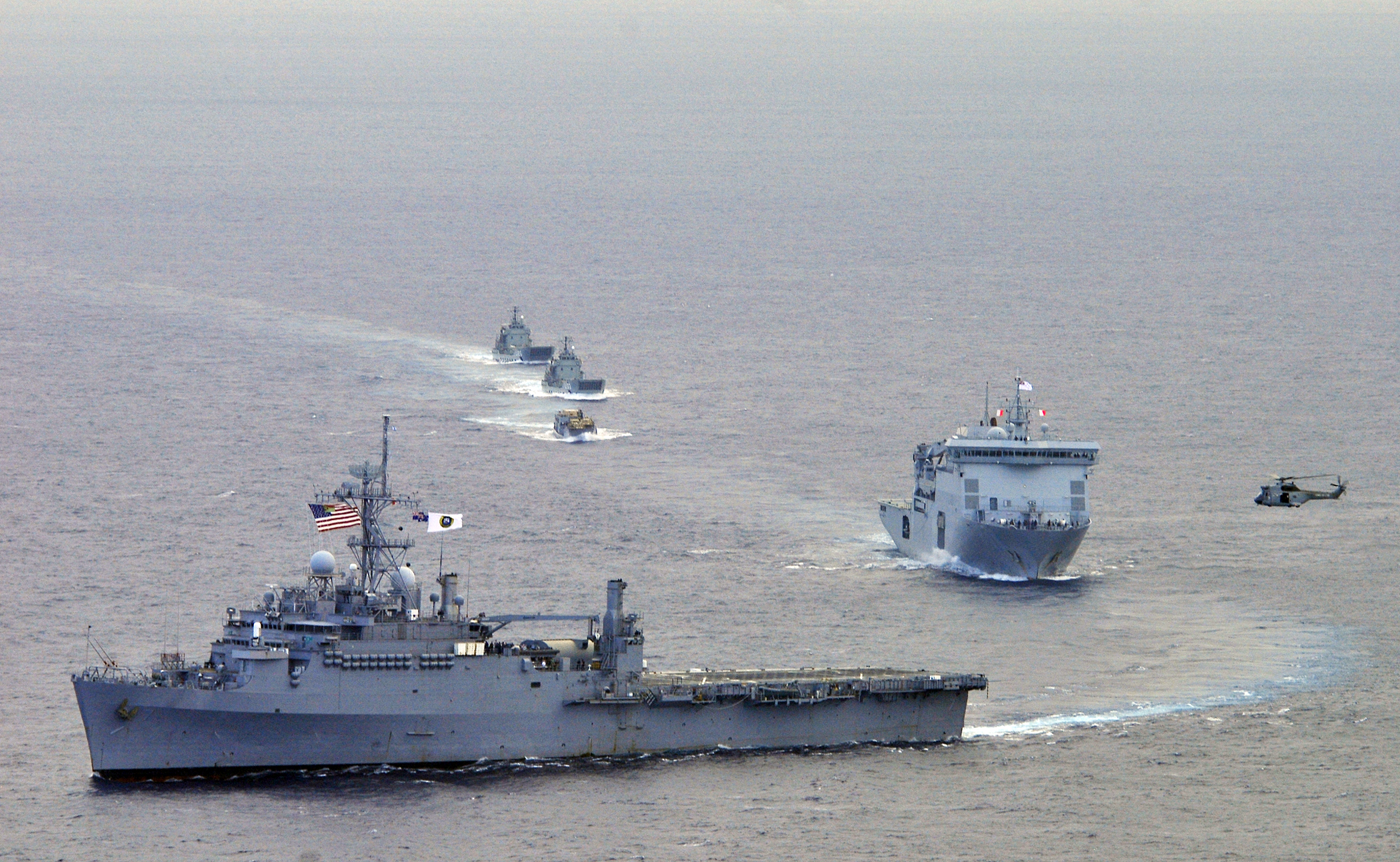
Ships from Pacific Partnership 2011 sailing through the Segond Channel

The 2011 deployment, which started on 21 March and ended on 4 August, was centered on the amphibious warfare ship USS Cleveland. In addition to USN personnel, resources deployed include personnel and equipment from other branches of the United States Armed Forces, government agencies, non-government organizations, and the militaries of Canada, Singapore, and Spain; ships from the United States Coast Guard, Australia, New Zealand, and Japan; and a helicopter team from France. In addition to carrying out medical and engineering infrastructure projects in Tonga, Vanuatu, Papua New Guinea, Timor-Leste, and the Federated States of Micronesia, the operation aimed to implement sustainability projects in these nations. In the first three ports, 21,000 patients were treated, thousands of contact hours of formal Subject Matter Expert Exchanges (SMEEs) were completed, and classrooms and a water catchment system were built. The total cost of the 2011 mission is reportedly $20 million or almost $4 million for each port of call.

Between 2006 and 2010, Pacific Partnership has visited 13 countries, treated more than 300,000 patients, and built over 130 engineering projects.

The 2012 deployment began with the USNS Mercy departing San Diego on 3 May and concluding its last humanitarian/medical mission in Cambodia on 11 August before heading for home port. Its goal was to establish opportunities for multinational crisis response capabilities supporting humanitarian and civic actions. The Mercy made two port calls on its way back; Guam and Hawaii. In addition to USN personnel, various other branches of the United States Armed Forces, government agencies, non-government agencies, as well as the militaries of Australia, Canada, Chile, Japan, Malaysia, Peru, Netherlands, New Zealand, Singapore, South Korea, and Thailand. One of the highlighted accomplishments was the development of a self-sustaining ecosystem at Bunaken National Park. Bunaken National Marine Park is a marine reserve park located in the Coral Triangle that provides a habitat to 390 species of coral as well as many fish, mollusk, reptile and marine mammal species. In Indonesia 200 surgeries were performed, over 2300 livestock and pets received veterinary care, and over 9,000 local citizens received medical evals and treatments. Philippines witnessed 271 surgeries, and the PP12 team treated over 16,000 patients. In Vietnam PP12 performed over 12,000 medical treatments; performed 207 surgeries; conducted nearly 4,000 treatments on 1,600 livestock and domestic animals; and completed renovations and a new building for two health clinics. During Pacific Partnership 2019, members of Naval Mobile Construction Battalion 4 (NMCB 4) deployed to Tuy Hòa, Phú Yên, Vietnam, where they constructed the Hòa Phú commune clinic. In Cambodia 12,679 patients were triaged; three surgical civic assistance programs resulting in 218 surgeries on board hospital ship USNS Mercy (T-AH 19) and at Preah Kossamek military hospital in Phnom Penh; four medical subject matter expert exchanges (SMEEs) on surgeries and medical techniques; three bio-medical repair SMEEs which resulted in 64 equipment repairs; two veterinary civic assistance projects where 1,375 animals received exams and treatments; three engineering civic assistance projects resulting in three new maternity wards.

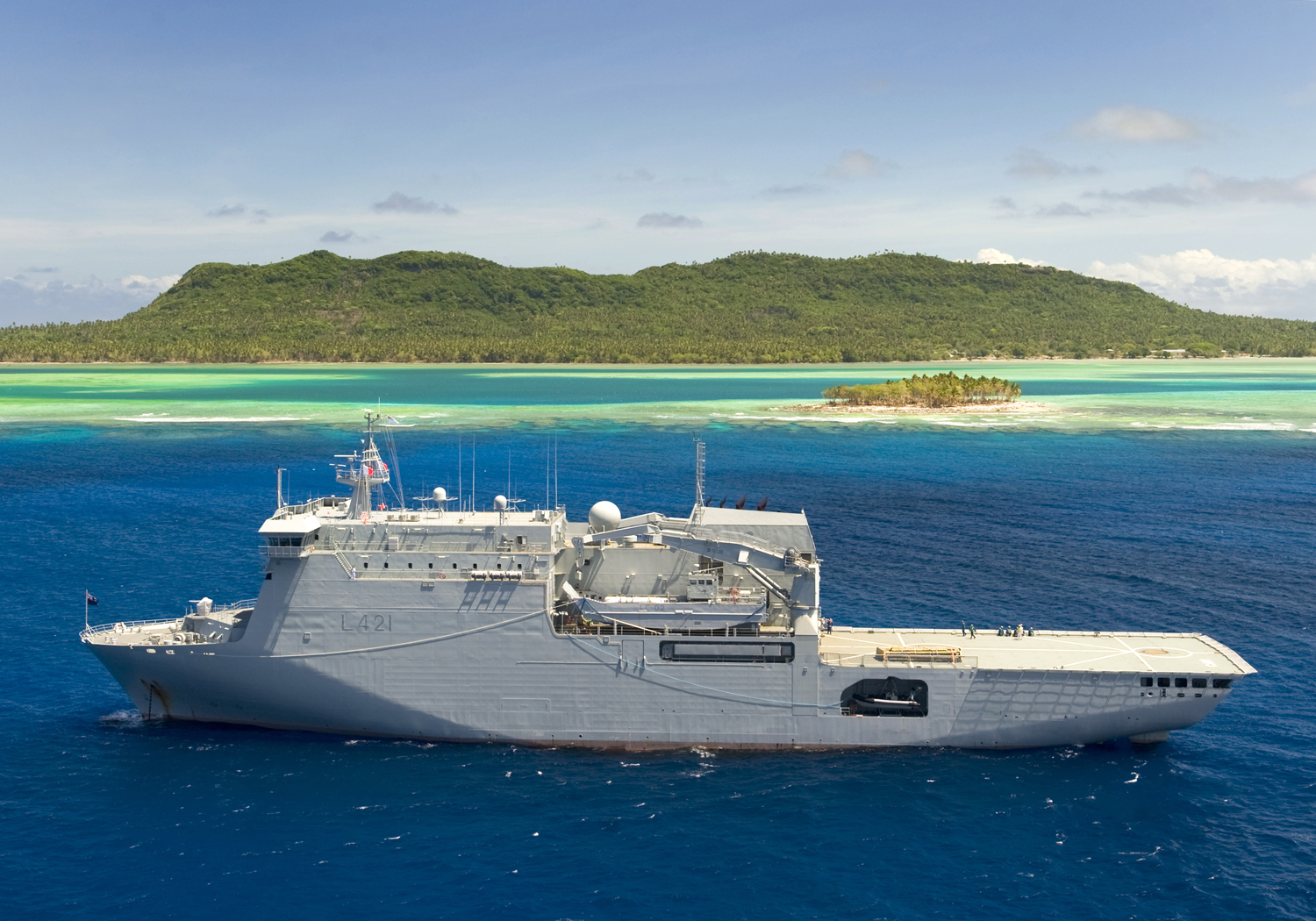
HMNZS Canterbury on Pacific Partnership 2013

The 2013 mission included significant participation by three key nations dividing up the mission beginning on 15 May and concluding their final missions on 13 Aug 2020. The U.S. with the USS Pearl Harbor concentrated its efforts on Samoa, Tonga and the Marshall Islands. Australia with HMAS Tobruk went to Papua New Guinea, and New Zealand sent HMNZS Manawanui to Kiribati and HMNZS Canterbury to the Solomon Islands. Other participating nations included Canada, France, Japan, and Malaysia. Also included were non-governmental organizations including NOAA, Project Handclasp, Project HOPE, USAID, Vets Without Borders and World Vets. In Samoa mission personnel held more than 60 medical and dental engagements, provided veterinary services at 12 sites triaging and treated 2,633 patients, vets evaluated 430 animals and performed five engineering missions and four underwater harbor surveys surveying more than 500 underwater acres while in Samoa. In Tonga the mission staff treated 5,455 patients, evaluated 3,000 animals and conducted 25 donation events.
