= Ship's tender =

Boat used to service larger ships

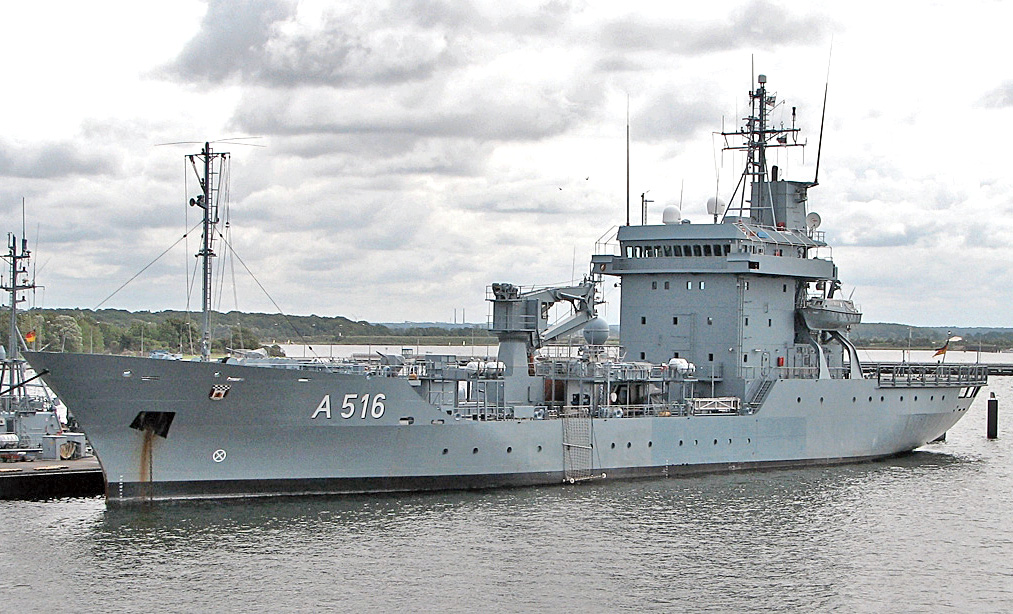
Donau, an Elbe-class tender of the German Navy

A ship's tender, usually referred to as a tender, is a boat or ship used to service or support other boats or ships. This is generally done by transporting people or supplies to and from shore or another ship.

A second and different meaning for "tender" is small boats carried by larger vessels, to be used either as lifeboats, or as transport to shore, or both.

== Purpose ==
For a variety of reasons, it is not always advisable to try to tie a ship up at a dock; the weather or the sea might be rough, the time might be short, or the ship too large to fit. In such cases tenders provide the link from ship to shore, and may have a very busy schedule of back-and-forth trips while the ship is in port.

On cruise ships, lifeboat tenders do double duty, serving as tenders in day-to-day activities, but fully equipped to act as lifeboats in an emergency. They are generally carried on davits just above the promenade deck, and may at first glance appear to be regular lifeboats; but they are usually larger and better-equipped. Current lifeboat tender designs favor catamaran models, since they are less likely to roll in the calm to moderate conditions in which tenders are usually used. They typically carry up to 100 to 150 passengers and two to three crew members.

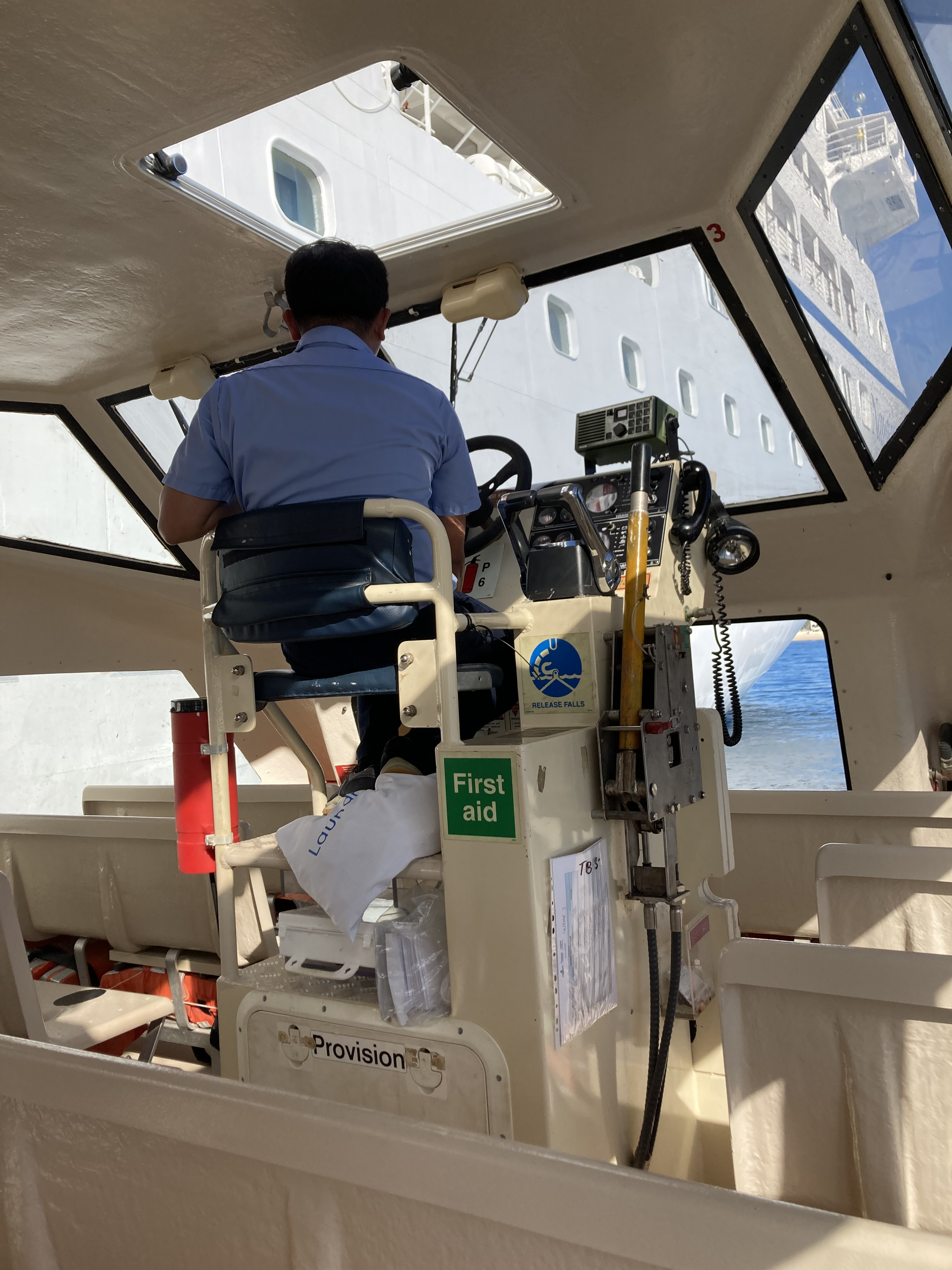
Pilot Station for the Tender or Lifeboat Carried on a Cruise Ship

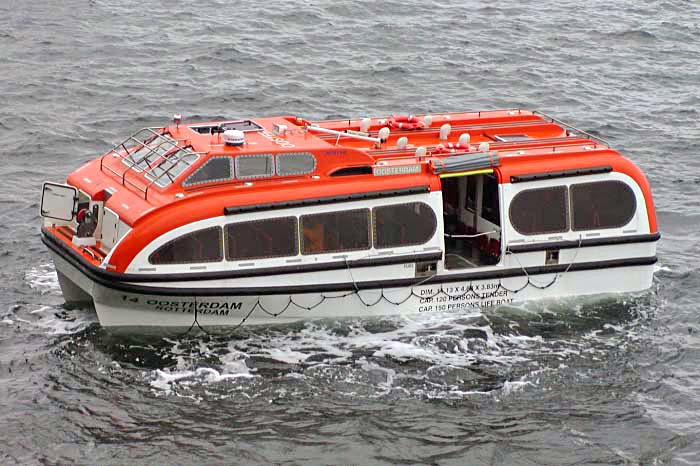
Lifeboat tender of MS Oosterdam; note the "face mask" over the front windows, and the rolled-up tarpaulin sheet that can be brought down over the entry port to make the boat weather resistant.

Before these ships were mass-produced, the main way to board a larger ship (mainly ocean liners) was to board a passenger tender. Passenger tenders remained based at their ports of registry, and when a ship came through the area, the tender would tie up with the ship and embark passengers on an elevated walkway. These vessels were larger, had a greater passenger capacity, and a broader sense of individuality in their respective companies than the more modern tenders seen today. Because of their increased size, lifeboats and life preservers were commonplace on board these ships (with two lifeboats being typical for an average tender).

Two tenders, SS Nomadic and SS Traffic, were built for the White Star Line by Harland and Wolff to serve the liners RMS Olympic and RMS Titanic at Cherbourg. Nomadic survives as a museum ship, and is the last remaining vessel built for the White Star Line in existence.

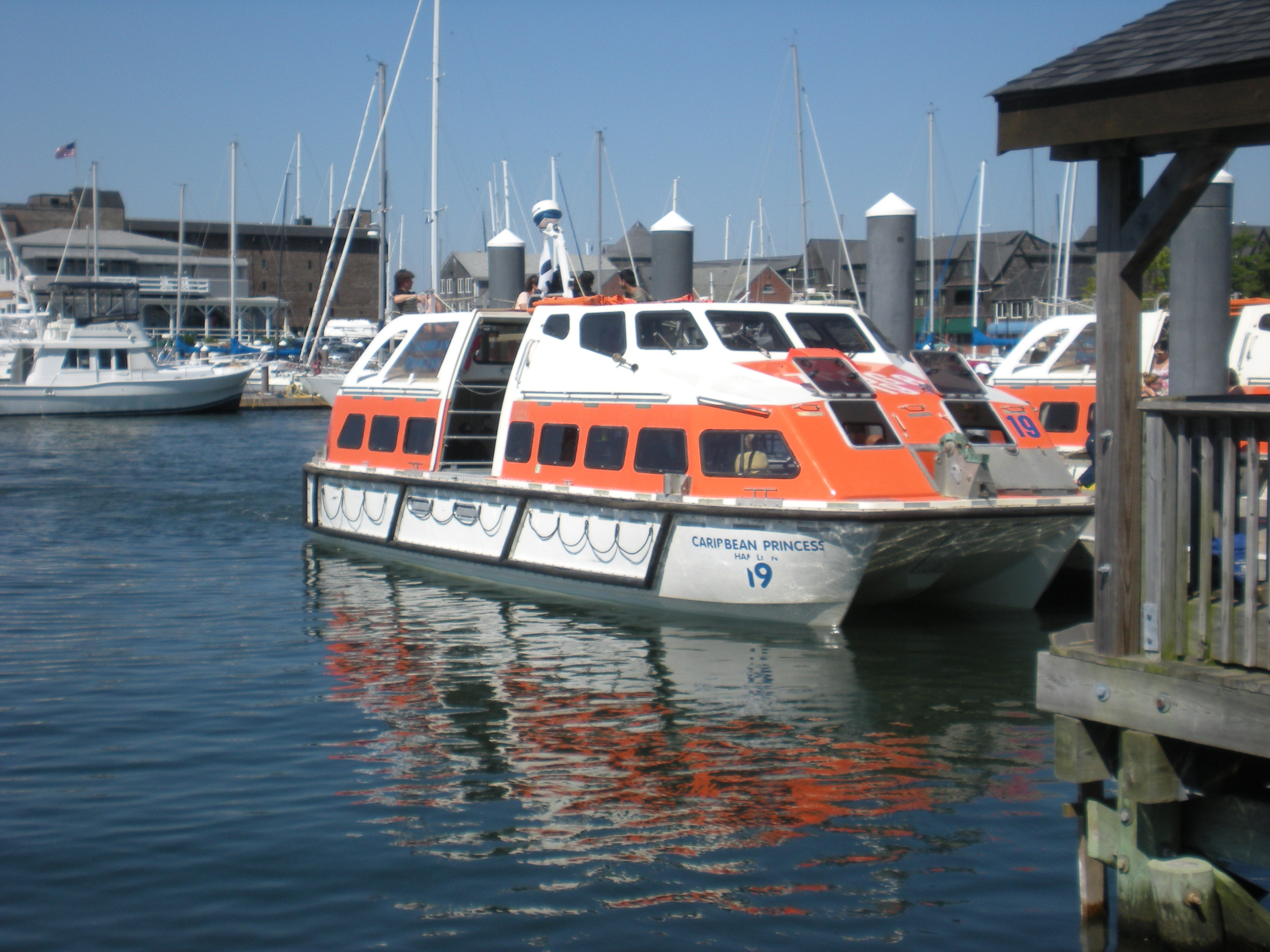
Caribbean Princess tenders docked at Bar Harbor, Maine, 31 August 2010

RIB tender of Prince William being winched aboard from a sortie on the North Sea

=== United States warships and submarines ===
Before the technologies that allow submarines and destroyers to operate independently matured by the latter half of the 20th century (and significantly during the Second World War), they were heavily dependent upon tenders to perform most maintenance and supply. Their hull classification symbols in the US Navy were, respectively, AS and AD, while general repair ships were AR. Naval tenders fell out of use during the late 20th century, as the speed and range of warships increased (reducing the need for advanced basing).

By the end of the 20th century, all of the tenders in the U.S. Navy had been inactivated except for two submarine tenders. As a result of the settlement of lawsuits over the Suisun Bay Reserve Fleet, the U.S. Navy and MARAD are engaged in an aggressive disposal program that will scrap all of those ships by 2017. While the Navy's plans for tenders held in reserve in other places (such as inactivated submarine tenders USS McKee and USS Simon Lake held at Inactive Ships, St. Juliens Creek Annex) were not addressed in that lawsuit, since its settlement, the Navy has indicated its desire to dispose of such ships as soon as possible.

Apparently not completely willing to wean itself from tenders all together – but with an eye towards reducing costs – the last two tenders remaining in active service have now been operationally turned over to the Military Sealift Command. Emory S. Land-class submarine tenders USS Emory S. Land and USS Frank Cable now operate with a "hybrid" crew. The commanding officer and approximately 200 technicians are Navy personnel, while the operation of the ship itself is performed by merchant mariners. Prior to the turn-over, both ships had more than 1,000 sailors. While at this time the ships still bear the AS classification, both ship's primary mission has been expanded well beyond submarines to include service and support of any Naval vessel in their operational area. Under the traditional Navy classification, both ships should be reclassified as AR (Auxiliary Repair), however since now operated by the MSC it is doubtful such a reassignment will occur. Emory S. Land is forward deployed in the Indian Ocean at Diego Garcia while Frank Cable is forward-deployed in the Pacific at Polaris Point, Apra Harbor, Guam. Such forward deployments are to provide service and support at the very great distances of the Western Pacific.

== Types ==
- Armed tender, 19th century British supply or transport ships that were outfitted and commissioned for military use in the Naval Service.
- Buoy tender, used to maintain navigational aids.
- Cannery tender, a type of commercial fishing vessel of the first half of the 20th century used to set up and maintain fish traps, transport fish from the traps to salmon canneries, patrol to prevent theft of fish from the traps, and transport personnel and supplies for salmon canneries.
- Chase boat, a tender generally not carried by the main vessel. It may be towed, travel under its own power, or be stationed in port.
- Destroyer tender, a large ship used to support a flotilla of destroyers or other small warships.
- Dive tender, a ship or boat used to support the actions of divers. Also known as a diving support vessel.
- Lighthouse tender, used to tend lighthouses, lightvessels, and, later, buoys.
- Mail tender, a small tender used to speed the delivery of mail from large liners
- Motor torpedo boat tender, a mobile base and supply ship used to support motor torpedo boats on operations during World War II.
- Pribilof tender, a term used for United States Government-owned and -operated cargo liners that provided transportation to, from, and between the Pribilof Islands from 1917 to 1975
- Seaplane tender, either a ship carrying multiple seaplanes, also known as a seaplane carrier, and considered to be a predecessor to the aircraft carrier; or a small craft used to support the operations of flying boats.
- Submarine tender, a large ship used to support a flotilla of submarines.
- Torpedo boat tender, a ship used during the late 19th and early 20th centuries to carry torpedo boats to sea and deploy them against enemy ships
- Yacht tender, a craft that services an anchored or moored yacht

== See also ==
- Bumboat – Small boat used to ferry supplies to ships moored away from the shore
- Ship's boat – Utility vessel
- Underway replenishment – Type of ship-to-ship transfer
