= Emory S. Land-class submarine tender =

Ship class of the U.S. Navy

Emory S. Land class
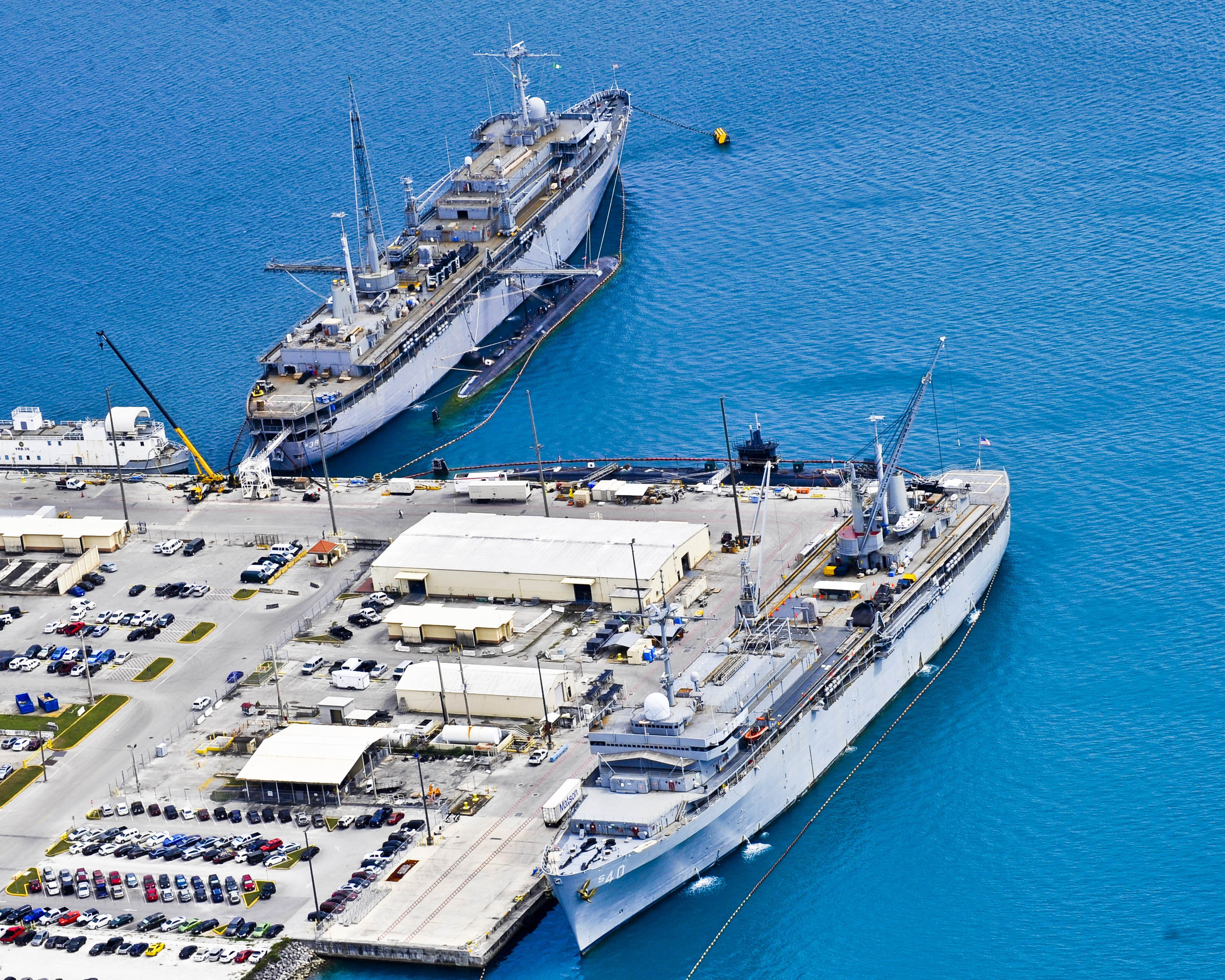
- Emory S. Land and Frank Cable at Guam, in 2017

Class overview
- Builders: Lockheed Shipbuilding and Construction Company, Seattle, Washington, U.S.
- Operators: United States Navy
- Preceded by: L. Y. Spear-class
- Built: 1976–1979
- In commission: 1979–present
- Completed: 3
- Active: 2

General characteristics
- Type: Submarine tender
- Tonnage: 9,000 LT DWT
- Displacement: 13,800 long tons (14,021 t) light; 23,000 long tons (23,369 t) full load
- Length: 649 ft (198 m)
- Beam: 85 ft (26 m)
- Draft: 26–29 ft (7.9–8.8 m)
- Propulsion: 2 × boilers; Steam turbine; 1 shaft; 20,000 shp (14,914 kW)
- Speed: 18 knots (33 km/h; 21 mph)
- Complement: 1,350
- Armament: 4 x 25 mm (0.98 in) MK 38 autocannon

The Emory S. Land-class submarine tender is a class of three submarine tenders in the United States Navy and Military Sealift Command. USS Emory S. Land is the lead ship in the class, the others are USS Frank Cable and USS McKee. McKee was the first ship in the class to be decommissioned. The Emory S. Land class is set to be replaced by two ships of the AS(X) class.

== Design ==
The Emory S. Land-class is identical to the preceding L. Y. Spear-class. The ships were specifically designed to service nuclear-powered attack submarines. They feature 53 specialized workshops on 13 decks on board. Four submarines can be serviced simultaneously. The ships are equipped with two 40 ton bow anchors and one 20 ton stern anchor, two 60 ton cranes and two 7 ton cranes. All ships have a helicopter landing pad aft, although no hangar.

== Ships in class ==
Italics indicate estimated dates

Ship	Hull no.	Crest	Builder	Commissioned	Decommissioned	Fate
Emory S. Land	AS-39		Lockheed Shipbuilding & Construction Co.	7 July 1979	2029	Active
Frank Cable	AS-40		Lockheed Shipbuilding & Construction Co.	29 October 1979	2030	Active
McKee	AS-41		Lockheed Shipbuilding & Construction Co.	15 August 1981	16 July 1999	Arrived at Brownsville to be recycled
