= Admiral McKee =

Admiral McKee may refer to:

- Andrew McKee (1896–1976), U.S. Navy admiral
- Fran McKee (1926–2002), U.S. Navy rear admiral
- Kinnaird R. McKee (1929–2013), U.S. Navy admiral
