= Emory S. Land =

United States Navy admiral (1879–1971)

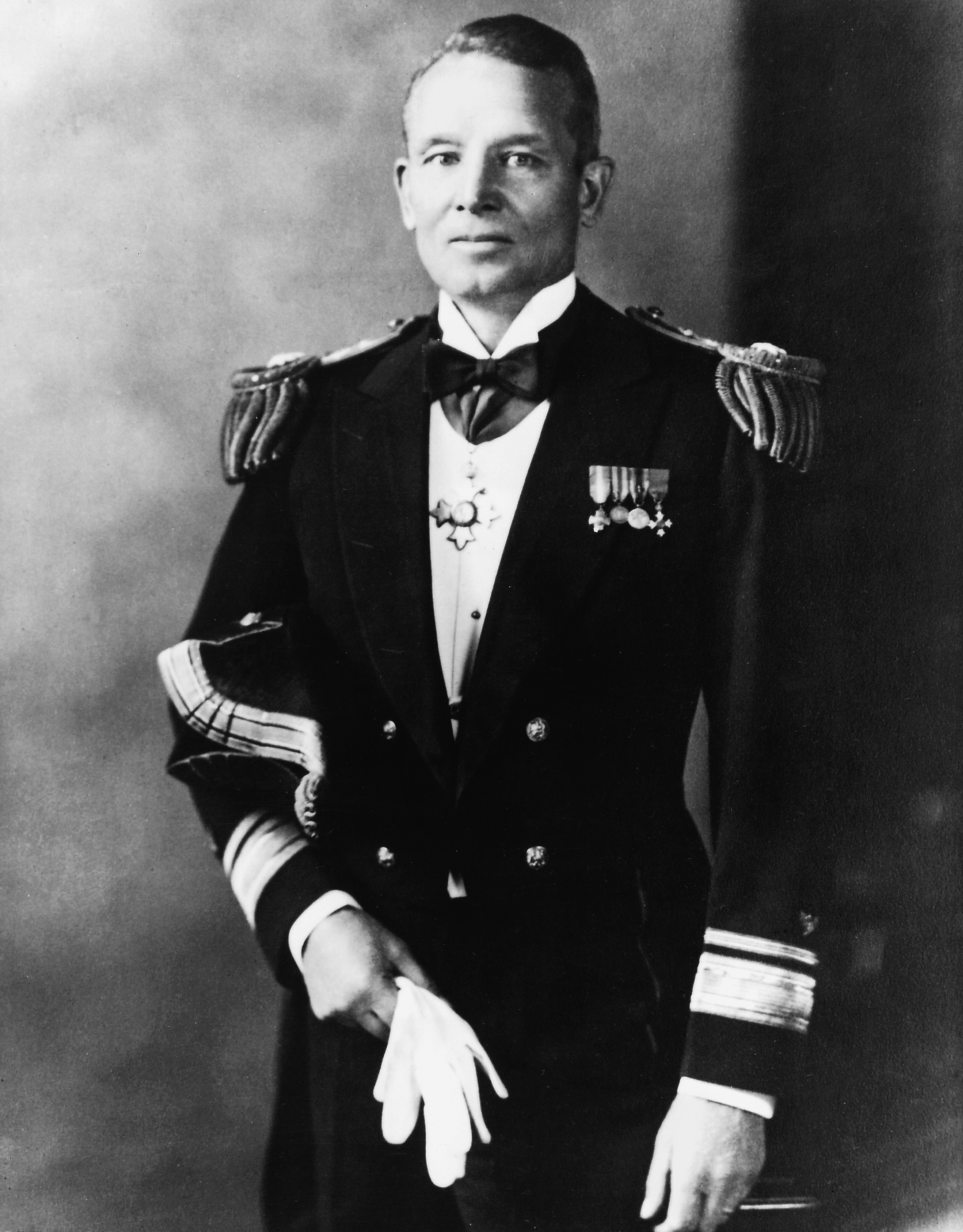
- Land in 1936
- Born: Emory Scott Land; January 9, 1879; Cañon City, Colorado, U.S.
- Died: November 27, 1971 (aged 92); Bethesda, Maryland, U.S.
- Burial place: Arlington National Cemetery
- Military career
- Allegiance: United States
- Branch: United States Navy
- Service years: 1902–1946
- Rank: Vice Admiral
- Nickname: Jerry
- Commands: Chairman, U.S. Maritime Commission
- Conflicts: World War I World War II
- Awards: Navy Cross; Army Distinguished Service Medal; Navy Distinguished Service Medal

Emory Scott Land (January 9, 1879 – November 27, 1971) was an officer in the United States Navy, noted for his contributions to naval architecture, particularly in submarine design. Notable assignments included serving as Chief of the Navy's Bureau of Construction and Repair during the 1930s, and as Chairman of the U.S. Maritime Commission during World War II.

== Early life and education ==
From Cañon City, Colorado, Land graduated from the University of Wyoming with an A.B. degree in 1898. He then entered the United States Naval Academy, graduating on May 21, 1902. Though only 135 to 140 pounds, he played football as a halfback for four years in Laramie and four years at Annapolis. In 1900, he scored the game-winning touchdown in the Army-Navy game after recovering a blocked kick.

Following two years of sea duty, he became a naval architect specializing in submarine construction. In 1907, Land earned a master's degree in mechanical engineering from the University of Wyoming and an M.S. degree in naval architecture and marine engineering from the Massachusetts Institute of Technology. In June 1939, he returned to the University of Wyoming to receive an honorary doctor of laws degree.

On April 15, 1909, Land married Elizabeth Catharine Stiles in Newton Centre, Massachusetts. In her honor, Admiral Land created the Betty Styles Land Memorial Fund to finance the Ships Literary Club, known as “the public library of the seas,” which provided free books for merchant seamen.

== Career ==
During World War I, he served on the Board of Devices and Plans connected with Submarines in Warfare, the Board of Standardization of Submarines, and the staff of Admiral William S. Sims, who commanded all U.S. naval forces in European waters.

Land played a key role in the design of the S-class submarines from 1917 to 1919, the United States Navy's first attempt to build a submarine capable of operating with the battle fleet. Land was vice chairman of the Navy's postwar V-boat Plans Committee in 1920. He was awarded the Navy Cross for his work on submarine design and construction and for work in the war zone.

=== Interwar years and World War II ===
In July 1922, Land qualified as a naval aviation observer in Pensacola, Florida. In January 1923, he was promoted to captain. Land subsequently earned a private pilot's license at the age of 49. His interest in aviation was partly spurred by his wife's cousin Charles Lindbergh. He served as assistant chief of the Navy Bureau of Aeronautics for about two years and then on extended leave as vice president and treasurer of the Daniel Guggenheim Fund for the Promotion of Aeronautics for over a year until 1930.

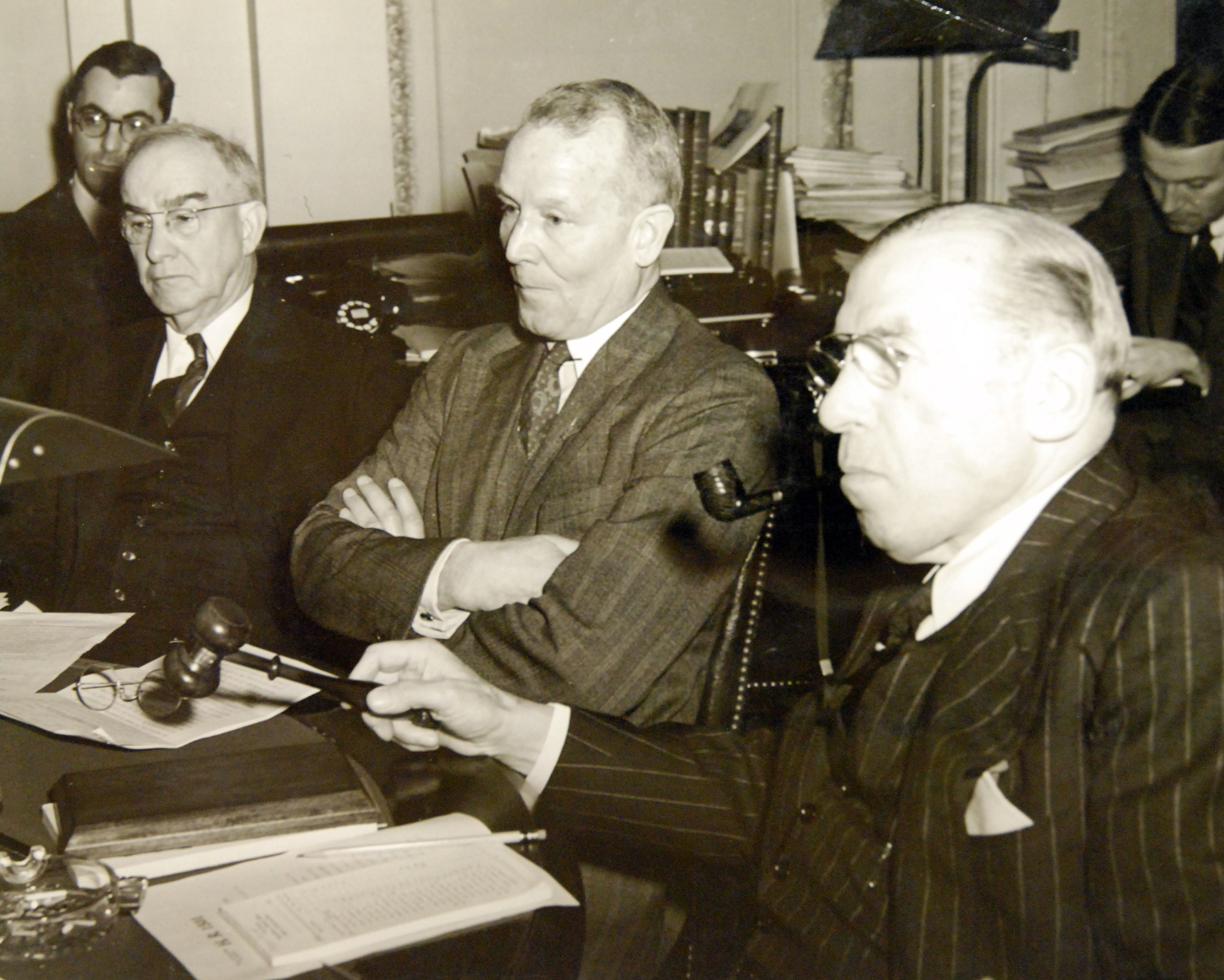
Land during World War II Lend-Lease Hearings, War Shipping Administrator, February 1943

From October 1, 1932, until April 1, 1937, Land was Chief of the Bureau of Construction and Repair. In this position, he played a major role in submarine development leading to the highly successful fleet boats of World War II.

Land retired as a rear admiral in 1937, but on February 18, 1938, he became Chairman of the U.S. Maritime Commission, overseeing the design and construction of the more than 4,000 Liberty ships and Victory ships that flew the U.S. flag during World War II. Land concurrently served as Administrator of the War Shipping Administration (WSA), established by Executive Order 9054 on February 7, 1942. Thus Land exercised authority over both construction and allocation of non-combatant maritime assets to Army, Navy and commerce. In July 1944, he was advanced to vice admiral on the retired list by a special act of Congress.

Land was also instrumental in overseeing the establishment of the United States Merchant Marine Academy, located in Kings Point, New York as a commissioning source for officers entering the Merchant Marine and Naval Reserve in World War II. Land Hall, located at the Academy, is named in his honor.

=== Post-war activities ===
On January 15, 1946, Land resigned as Chairman of the U.S. Maritime Commission. For his outstanding services he was rewarded with both the Army Distinguished Service Medal and the Navy Distinguished Service Medal by the War Department.

== Later life and death ==
Land served as President of the Air Transport Association of America from 1946 to 1957 and worked as a consultant for General Dynamics Corporation until his death in November 1971 at age 92. He lived in Washington, D.C., and continued to walk several miles daily, but died at the Naval Hospital in Bethesda, Maryland. Land was buried beside his wife at Arlington National Cemetery, in Arlington, Virginia.

== Awards and decorations ==
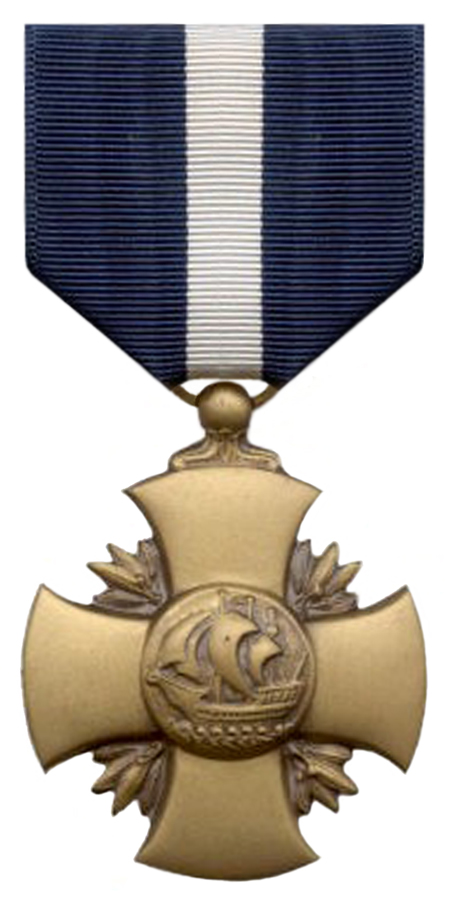
Navy Cross medal

Land's personal decorations include:

- Navy Cross
- Army Distinguished Service Medal
- Navy Distinguished Service Medal
- Spanish Campaign Medal
- World War I Victory Medal with Submarine Clasp
- American Defense Service Medal
- American Campaign Medal
- World War II Victory Medal
- Honorary Commander of the Order of the British Empire (CBE) 1921
- Honorary Knight Commander of the Order of the British Empire (KBE) 1945
- Commander of the Legion of Honour 1947
- Grand Officer Second Class Polonia Restituta presented by Polish Government in Exile
- Philippine Legion of Honor
- Honorary Doctor of Laws
- Honorary Graduate of the United States Merchant Marine Academy

== Legacy ==
- The submarine tender USS Emory S. Land (AS-39) is named for him.
- His uniform is on display aboard the SS American Victory.
