= USS Frank Cable =

Submarine tender of the United States Navy

USS Frank Cable (AS-40)
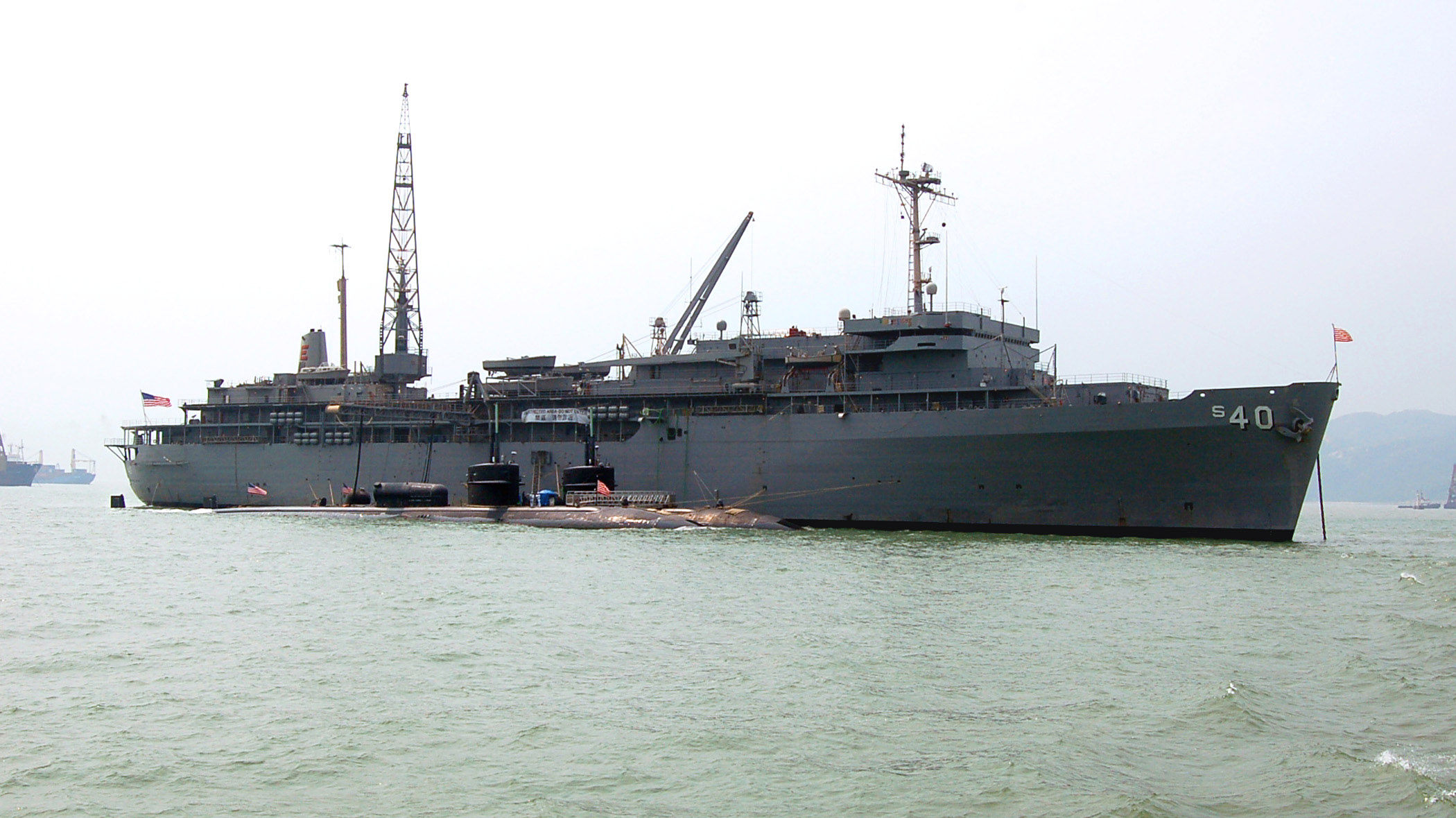
- USS Frank Cable (AS-40)

History

United States
- Name: USS Frank Cable
- Namesake: Frank Cable
- Awarded: 20 November 1974
- Builder: Lockheed Shipbuilding and Construction Company, Seattle, Washington, U.S.
- Laid down: 2 March 1976
- Launched: 14 January 1978
- Commissioned: 20 October 1979
- Home port: Apra Harbor, Guam
- Motto: PARATA VOLLENSQUE (Prepare Gladly)
- Honours and awards: 7 × Meritorious Unit Commendations; 9 × Battle Effectiveness Awards; Humanitarian Service Medal
- Status: in active service
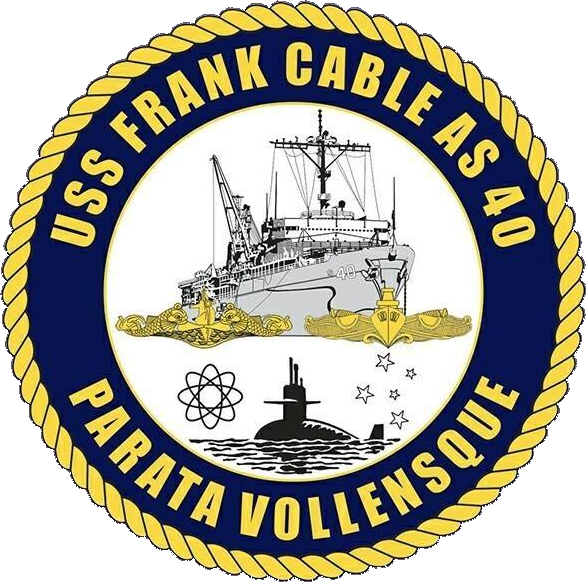
- Badge

General characteristics
- Class & type: Emory S. Land-class submarine tender
- Tonnage: 9,068 long tons deadweight (DWT)
- Displacement: 13,758 long tons (13,979 t) light; 22,826 long tons (23,192 t) full load
- Length: 649 ft (198 m)
- Beam: 85 ft (26 m)
- Draft: 26–29 ft (7.9–8.8 m)
- Propulsion: 2 × boilers; Steam turbine; 1 shaft; 20,000 shp (14,914 kW)
- Speed: 22 knots (41 km/h; 25 mph)
- Complement: 81 officers, 1,270 enlisted
- Armament: 2 × 40 mm AA guns; 4 × 25 mm Mk 38 AA guns

USS Frank Cable (AS-40) is the second Emory S. Land-class submarine tender built by the Lockheed Shipbuilding and Construction Company of Seattle, Washington for the United States Navy.

The ship was christened on 14 January 1978 by Mrs. Rose A. Michaelis, wife of Admiral Frederick H. Michaelis, then Chief of Naval Material. The ship is named for Frank Cable, an electrical engineer who had worked as an electrician and trial captain for USS Holland (SS-1).

== History ==
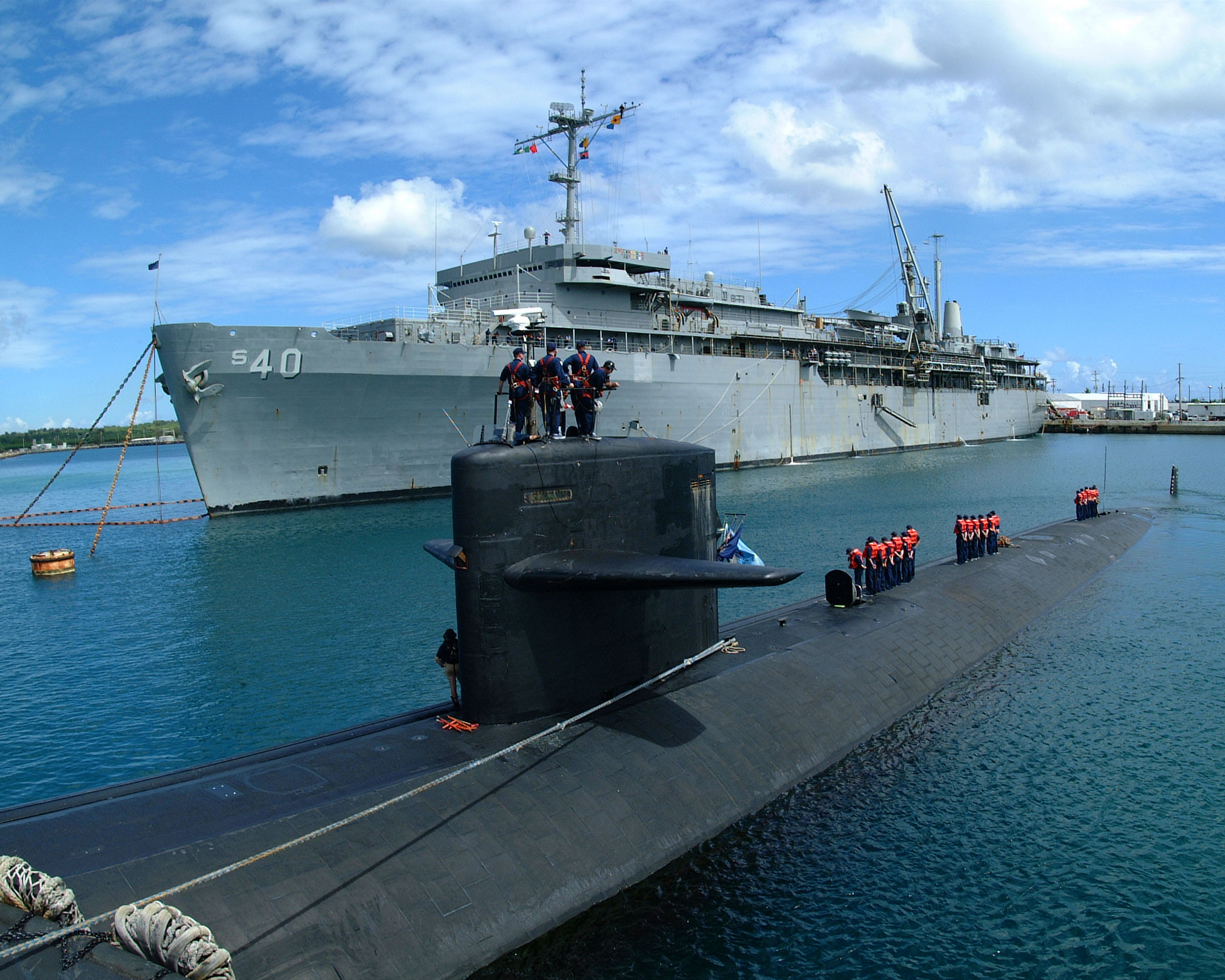
USS Frank Cable (AS-40) at her home port of Apra Harbor, Guam in May 2002.

USS Frank Cable was designed as a submarine tender for Los Angeles-class submarines. The ship spent 1980 until 1996 as the repair ship for SUBRON 4 and 18 in Charleston, South Carolina, tending Sturgeon and Benjamin Franklin-class submarines. Frank Cable began decommissioning in 1996, but then was reactivated and refitted to replace USS Holland (AS-32) in the Western Pacific as Commander Seventh Fleet's mobile repair and support platform.

Since arriving in Guam, USS Frank Cable has visited many Western Pacific ports to support U.S. military forces. In 1997, the ship was heavily involved with the rescue and recovery efforts following the Korean Air Flight 801 crash on Guam, and also in the recovery and clean-up efforts following Typhoon Paka. From 1980 to 2003, USS Frank Cable garnered many awards as a unit of both the U.S. Atlantic and Pacific Fleets, including seven Meritorious Unit Commendations, nine Battle Efficiency "E" awards and three Golden Anchor Awards. Frank Cable's most recent recognition was a Humanitarian Service Medal for support provided in recovery efforts on Guam following Super Typhoon Pongsona in 2002.

USS Frank Cable is most recently known for a crew member, MMA2 Slicer, who saved a baby in 2017.

USS Frank Cable held a wreath-laying ceremony after departing Jakarta on 25 July 2022 to honor the 53 Indonesian Sailors who lost their lives aboard the KRI Nanggala which sank on 21 April 2021 off the coast of Bali. On 26th August 2025, she visited the Port of Chennai in India as a part of a goodwill visit.

=== 2006 boiler casualty ===
On 1 December 2006, while Frank Cable was moored at Polaris Point in Apra Harbor, Guam, after returning from a day-long "Friends and Family Cruise", a boiler casualty occurred in the ship's No. 1 fireroom during maintenance checks of steam safety valves. According to the Navy, the No. 1 boiler experienced a major steam leak into its firebox, rupturing an exhaust plenum and sending pressurized steam into the fireroom, where 14 sailors were standing watch or observing the maintenance. Watchstanders secured the boiler to prevent further damage to the ship before evacuating the space; all but one of the sailors present were injured. Six sailors with severe burns were evacuated to the Army burn center at Brooke Army Medical Center in Texas; two others were treated at U.S. Naval Hospital Guam and released. Seaman Jack Valentine, 20, of Zion, Illinois, a machinery repairman, died of his injuries on 7 December 2006 and was posthumously promoted to petty officer third class. Chief Machinist's Mate Delfin Dulay, 42, died on 30 April 2007. Three of the surviving sailors — Petty Officer 1st Class Robert Bruce II, Petty Officer 2nd Class Michael Lammey, and Petty Officer 3rd Class Matthew Bove — received the Navy and Marine Corps Commendation Medal for their actions during the casualty.

A Judge Advocate General's Manual investigation, released in redacted form under the Freedom of Information Act in May 2007, identified corroded tubing that ruptured during the safety valve check as the root cause of the casualty. The investigation found that the ship's commanding officer, Capt. Leo Goff, and its chief engineer had committed "errors in judgment" by proceeding with the test before determining the cause of abnormal chemistry concentration and feedwater consumption in the boiler, and that the failure of the executive officer, Cmdr. Steve Cole, and the chief engineer to conduct fireroom evacuation training "may have led to more serious injuries"; four of the 14 sailors in the space had no documented emergency exit training. The report stated that the officers' decisions were not malicious acts or negligence, and referred the question of administrative or disciplinary action to Commander, Submarine Group 7. The investigation also found that civilian ambulance response to the ship took 47 to 70 minutes, and that the sailors' coveralls and the ship's stretcher inventory were inadequate for a mass casualty event. The investigation concluded that the injured sailors' injuries were incurred in the line of duty and not through misconduct.

In June 2015, the Machinery Repairman "A" School at Naval Station Great Lakes named its graduation room in Valentine's honor. At the ceremony, his mother said that the dedication meant her son would not be forgotten: "As long as people remember him a little part of him will be alive."

=== Awards ===
- Navy Meritorious Unit Commendation - (Jan 1985 – Sep 1986, Aug 1989 – Feb 1991, Jan 1993 – Mar 1995, Apr 1995 – Apr 1997, Jan 1997 – Jan 1998, Jul 1999 – Jul 2001, Aug 2001 – Jul 2003, Jul 2002 – Jan 2003, Aug 2003 – Jul 2005, Nov 2011 – Oct 2012, Mar 2020 - Jun 2020)
- Battle "E" - (1986, 1989, 1996, 1998, 1999, 2001, 2002, 2008, 2009, 2010, 2011, 2014, 2015, 2016, 2018, 2020, 2021)
- Humanitarian Service Medal - (8-31 Dec 2002) Typhoon Pongsona
- SECNAV Safety Excellence Award - (2016, 2017)
- SECNAV Environmental Stewardship Award - (2017)
