= USS Emory S. Land =

Tender of the United States Navy

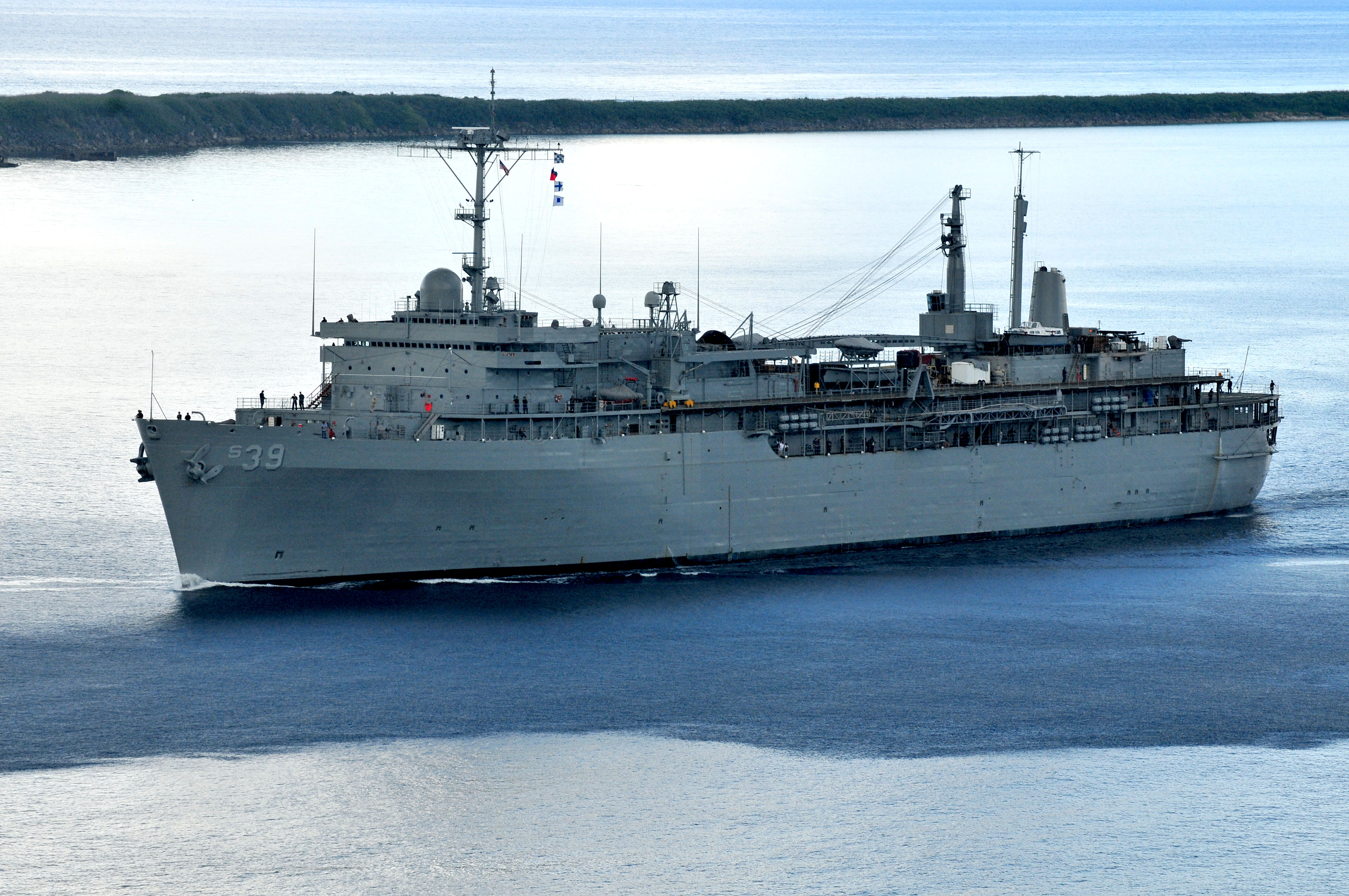
- USS Emory S. Land (AS-39)

History

United States
- Name: USS Emory S. Land
- Namesake: Emory S. Land
- Awarded: 20 November 1974
- Builder: Lockheed Shipbuilding and Construction Company, Seattle, Washington, U.S.
- Laid down: 2 March 1976
- Launched: 4 May 1977
- Commissioned: 7 July 1979
- Home port: Apra Harbor, Guam
- Motto: Land of Opportunity
- Honours and awards: 2 × Meritorious Unit Commendations; 4 × Battle Effectiveness Awards; Navy Expeditionary Medal; Armed Forces Expeditionary Medal
- Status: in active service
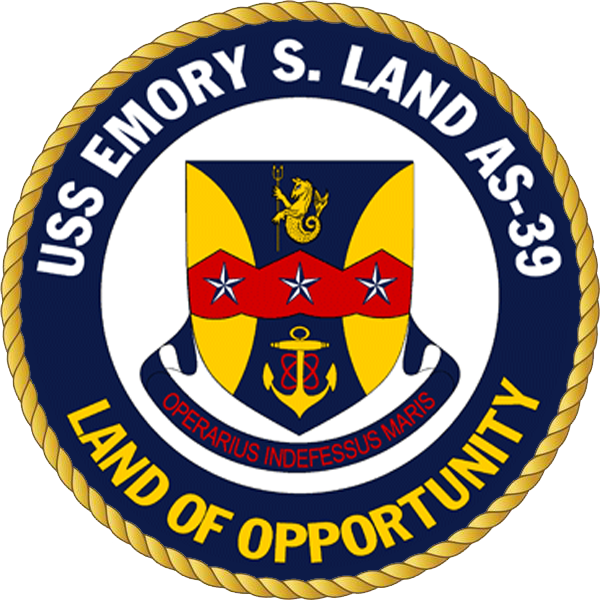
- Badge

General characteristics
- Class & type: Emory S. Land-class submarine tender
- Tonnage: 9,067 LT DWT
- Displacement: 13,911 long tons (14,134 t) light; 22,978 long tons (23,347 t) full load
- Length: 649 ft (198 m)
- Beam: 85 ft (26 m)
- Draft: 26–29 ft (7.9–8.8 m)
- Propulsion: 2 × boilers; Steam turbine; 1 shaft; 20,000 shp (14,914 kW)
- Speed: 18 knots (33 km/h; 21 mph)
- Complement: 900 Navy/150 Military Sealift Command (MSC)
- Armament: 2 × 40 mm AA guns; 4 × 20 mm AA guns; 4 × 0.5 in (12.7 mm) machine guns

USS Emory S. Land (AS-39) is a United States Navy submarine tender and the lead ship of her class. She was named for Admiral Emory S. Land.

The ship provides food, electricity, water, consumables, spare parts, medical, dental, disbursing, mail, legal services, ordnance, and any parts or equipment repair that a submarine may require. To accomplish this, the ship has a physical plant similar to that of a small town, including 53 different specialized shops.

== History ==
Following commissioning, she was originally homeported in Norfolk, Virginia at various D&S (i.e., destroyer and submarine) piers in support of the newly established Submarine Squadron Eight (SubRon8) for the new SSN-688 Class submarines (SSN-689, SSN-691, SSN-693, SSN-695, SSN-697, SSN-699). When she deployed from Puget Sound Naval Shipyard her first port of call was Oakland, California; from there she cruised to Acapulco, Mexico before arriving in port at Norfolk, Virginia. She spent time in refresher training at Guantanamo Bay, Cuba.

Upon the commissioning of Submarine Squadron 8 on 4 August 1979, she became the squadron flagship.

In September 1980, Emory S. Land deployed to the Pacific Fleet to provide services to the Indian Ocean Battle Group. She made two port calls in Spain, (Palma Majorca and Malaga) and Haifa, Israel before arriving in Diego Garcia. During the spring of 1981, she paid a 3-4-day port visit to Halifax along with one SubRon8 unit while moored at Canadian Forces Base Shearwater, Dartmouth, Nova Scotia. In July 1986, Emory S. Land operated as Officer in Tactical Command of four United States ships and five foreign ships in transit from the Virginia Capes operating area to the New York Harbor where she participated in the International Naval Review and Fourth of July Statue of Liberty rededication ceremonies. In August 1987, Emory S. Land operated as the tactical and communications platform for Submarine Squadron 8 and Submarine Squadron 6 to work both with and against a surface combatant group.

In 1988, Emory S. Land was underway and deployed for 182 days. During the deployment, the ship steamed 26,011 nautical miles (48,172 km) and circumnavigated the world. Port visits included Lisbon, Portugal; Naples, Italy, Port Said, Egypt; Muscat, Oman; Fremantle, Western Australia; and Rodman Naval Station, Panama. During her 92 days anchored at a remote site off the coast of Oman, she tended the surface combatants of Joint Task Force Middle East and Carrier Battle Groups Golf and Charlie. Immediate superior in command (ISIC) for this period was Commander Task Force 73.

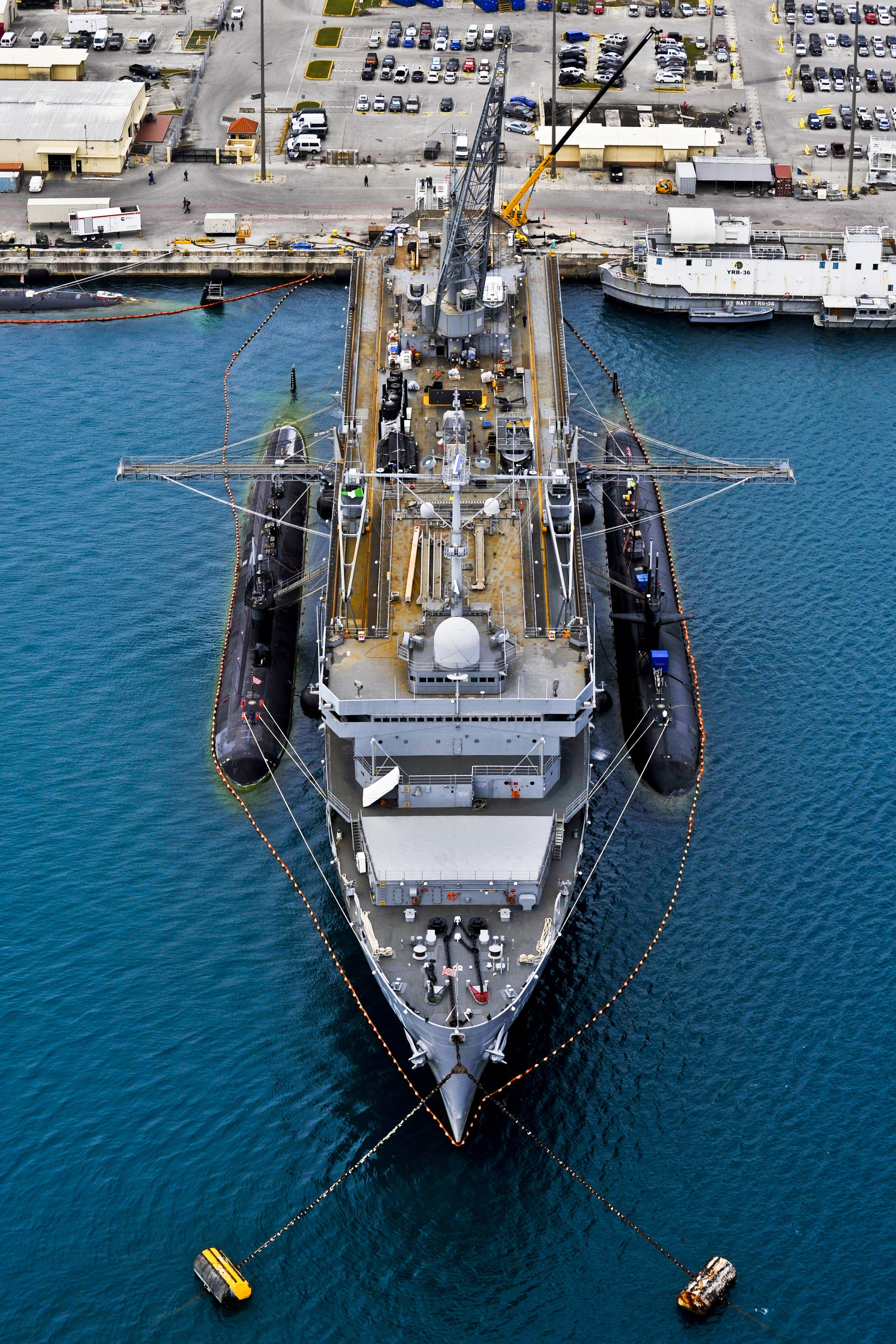
Emory S. Land tending USS Chicago and USS Pasadena at Guam, in 2017.

In 1991, with the departure of USS L. Y. Spear and the transition of USS Hunley (AS-31) to Submarine Squadron 6, USS Emory S. Land's Supply Department assumed full responsibility for Submarine Squadron 8 supply support.

In July 1993, Emory S. Land served as the Commander, Submarine Group 2 flagship during a port visit to Boston, and was the host ship for a visit by the Commanding-In-Chief, Russian Northern Fleet and three visiting Russian ships.

Emory S. Land returned to its homeport 30 May 2007 after a seven-day visit to the nation of Montenegro. Emory S. Land is only the third U.S. Naval ship to visit Montenegro since the United States began diplomatic relations with the country in 2006.

Upon turnover and relief of USS Simon Lake (AS-33), Emory S. Land served at La Maddalena, Italy as the sole permanently assigned vessel in Submarine Force, U.S. Atlantic Fleet's Submarine Group 8 from May, 1999, until 30 September 2007, on which date she departed for Bremerton, Washington, where she underwent a conversion to a hybrid US Navy/Military Sealift Command crew. She departed Bremerton, Washington on 14 June 2010 and after port calls in Hawaii, Guam and Singapore, arrived in her new homeport of Diego Garcia on 14 August 2010.

The ship's commanding officer, Captain Eric Merrill, was removed from command on 21 June 2011 after the ship struck a channel buoy at Mina Salman, Bahrain earlier that same month. The ship was damaged in the collision.

On 23 December 2015, it was announced that Emory S. Land would change its homeport to Naval Base Guam.

In December 2023, it was announced that Emory S. Land would deploy from Guam to HMAS Stirling, Australia's naval base in Western Australia, and conduct the US Navy's first submarine maintenance work in Australia during the southern hemisphere winter. Thirty Australian sailors will be embarked to learn how to repair a Virginia-class submarine, as part of the AUKUS agreement.

== Awards ==
Since her commissioning, Emory S. Land has received four Meritorious Unit Commendations (1984, 1987, 2007, and 2012), the Navy Expeditionary Medal (1980), Armed Forces Expeditionary Medal (1988), and eight Battle Efficiency Awards (1981, 1982, 1983, 1996, 2000, 2002, 2012, and 2013) in addition to numerous departmental awards. She was awarded a Secretary of the Navy Letter of Commendation in 1988. The ship won the Captain Edward F. Ney Memorial for Large Ship Food Service Excellence in 1985 and 1995, the Safety "S" award for 1995, and the Red "DC" in 1995.

Meritorious Unit Commendation with three stars	Navy E Ribbon	Navy Expeditionary Medal
National Defense Service Medal with one star	Armed Forces Expeditionary Medal	Global War on Terrorism Expeditionary Medal
Global War on Terrorism Service Medal	Sea Service Deployment Ribbon with nine stars	Navy/Marine Corps Overseas Service Medal with eight stars

== In popular culture ==
- The ship is featured prominently in the 2012 naval thriller, Fire of the Raging Dragon, by Don Brown.
