= USS McKee (AS-41) =

Tender of the United States Navy

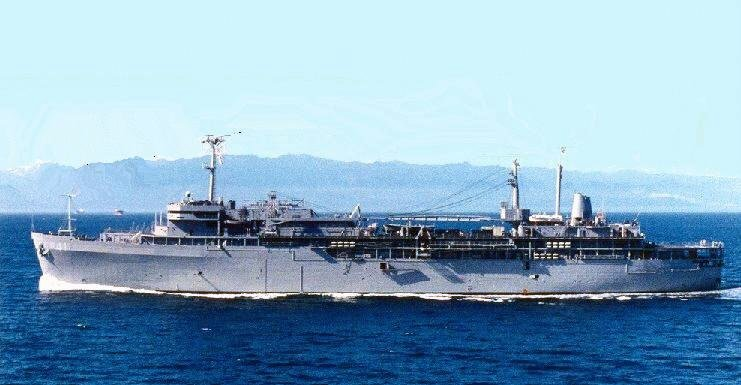

History

United States
- Name: USS McKee
- Namesake: Andrew McKee
- Builder: Lockheed Shipbuilding and Construction Company, Seattle, Washington, U.S.
- Laid down: 14 January 1978
- Launched: 16 February 1980
- Commissioned: 15 August 1981
- Decommissioned: 16 July 1999
- Stricken: 25 April 2006
- Home port: Naval Base Point Loma, San Diego, California, U.S.
- Motto: "Plus Ultra Plurimum" (English: The Best of the Best)
- Honors and awards: 3 × Meritorious Unit Commendations; 4 × Battle Effectiveness Awards; National Defense Service Medal; Southwest Asia Service Medal; Retention Excellence Award (Golden Anchor)
- Fate: Arrived at Brownsville for scrapping, 2024
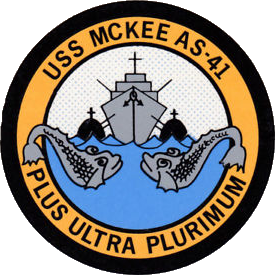
- Badge

General characteristics
- Class & type: Emory S. Land-class submarine tender
- Displacement: 23,000 long tons (23,369 t) full
- Length: 645 ft 8 in (196.80 m)
- Beam: 85 ft (26 m)
- Draft: 26 ft (7.9 m)
- Propulsion: 2 × 600psi boilers; Steam turbine; 1 shaft; 20,000 shp (14,914 kW)
- Speed: 20 knots (37 km/h; 23 mph)
- Complement: 1,500 officers and enlisted
- Armament: 4 × 20 mm AA guns; 5 × 0.5 in (12.7 mm) machine guns

USS McKee (AS-41), named after Andrew McKee, was the third Emory S. Land-class submarine tender built by the Lockheed Shipbuilding and Construction Company of Seattle, Washington for the United States Navy.

The USS McKee was a mobile submarine support and repair facility capable of providing simultaneous maintenance to up to 12 nuclear-powered or diesel-electric fast-attack submarines. Its facilities included medical and dental services, material-handling equipment, refrigerated and dry storage, and workshops for nuclear systems, electrical and electronic equipment, hulls, piping, metalwork, foundry operations, woodworking, and printing. The ship also provided diving and submarine rescue services, hazardous-material management, and repair facilities for propulsion and weapons systems.

USS McKee was one of the first warships in the U.S. Navy to integrate female sailors.

== History ==
=== 1981–1989 ===
The ship was commissioned on 16 August 1981. After a series of sea trials, McKee replaced the USS Sperry (AS-12) and joined the USS Dixon (AS-37) at Point Loma (San Diego) to support Pacific Fleet submarines. Upon the commissioning of Submarine Squadron 11 (COMSUBRON11) in July 1986, she became the squadron's Command Ship.

Early in 1984, McKee became the first submarine tender certified to support the new Tomahawk cruise missile system. McKee earned three consecutive Battle Efficiency "E" awards in 1985, 1986 and 1987. In addition to the Battle "E" in 1986, McKee was honored with the Golden Anchor Award for retention excellence and her first Meritorious Unit Commendation.

In 1989, the McKee was the first submarine tender to visit Cold Bay, Alaska since World War II, and conducted the first nuclear submarine upkeep at this remote location. 1988 saw McKee become the first submarine tender certified to handle the Tomahawk Vertical Launch System (VLS).

In February 1989 the McKee performed the first at-sea weapons transfer to a submarine since World War II, to the USS Ohio (SSBN-726).

=== 1990–1999 ===
In March 1990, the McKee continued leading the way for submarine tenders by participating in the first underway fuel replenishment (UNREP) by a Pacific Fleet submarine tender. This fuel was in preparation for deployment to the Persian Gulf in January 1991.

When Operation Desert Storm began, the McKee deployed to the Persian Gulf and spent six months providing support to submarines and surface combatants in Jebel Ali, just outside Dubai, United Arab Emirates. McKee was awarded a second Meritorious Unit Commendation and the Southwest Asia Service Medal. Following Desert Storm, McKee was awarded a fourth Battle Efficiency "E" Award.

In 1995, after the decommissioning of USS Dixon, McKee provided all support to San Diego based submarines. Assistance was also provided to many Allied submarines while they visited Point Loma.

In 1998, McKee earned a third Meritorious Unit Commendation following a six-month deployment to Pearl Harbor. During this deployment, McKee provided services and conducted repairs to both U.S. and Allied submarines and surface combatants. Upon returning to San Diego, the ship took the lead in establishing shore-based services that will support the submarines after McKee's departure.

In November 1998, the weapons department of the USS McKee loaded Tomahawk cruise missiles onto HMS Splendid (S106). These were the first of 67 Tomahawk cruise missiles sold to the Royal Navy and the first British submarine to receive the Tomahawk missiles. They were later used by HMS Splendid in offensive operations against Serbian targets during the Kosovo War.

On 1 October 1999, McKee was decommissioned from service and moved to the Naval Inactive Ship Maintenance Facility (NISMF), located in Portsmouth, Virginia. She was struck from the Naval Register on 25 April 2006.

== Post decommissioning ==
In June 2024, the Ex-USS McKee arrived in Brownsville, Texas for recycling.

== Awards ==
- Navy Meritorious Unit Commendation – x4
- Navy E Ribbon – x3
- Southwest Asia Service Medal – (Jan-Apr 1991) Gulf War
- Kuwait Liberation Medal (Kuwait)

== In popular culture ==
- McKee is a submarine support vessel in the book SSN by Tom Clancy, playing an active role in battling the People's Liberation Army Navy in a fictional war over the Spratly Islands. USS Cheyenne (SSN-773) is the namesake submarine.
