= Andrew McKee =

United States Navy admiral

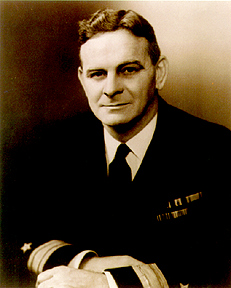
- McKee while a commodore in the US Navy
- Born: February 17, 1896; Lawrenceburg, Kentucky
- Died: January 24, 1976 (aged 79); New York City
- Relatives: great-grandson of Admiral James F. Schenck
- Military career
- Allegiance: United States of America
- Branch: United States Navy
- Service years: 1917–1947
- Rank: Rear Admiral
- Commands: Philadelphia Naval Shipyard
- Conflicts: World War II
- Awards: Legion of Merit; Bronze Star
- Other work: Research and design engineer for the Electric Boat Division of the General Dynamics corporation

Rear Admiral Andrew I. McKee (February 17, 1896 – January 24, 1976) was a pioneer in modern submarine design and development. The destroyer USS Schenck was named for his maternal great-grandfather, Admiral James F. Schenck. McKee graduated from the United States Naval Academy at the top of his class in navigation and was commissioned an ensign in March 1917. He served with USS Huntington until he severely injured both legs in a fall from the mast in August 1917. He was declared unfit for sea duty, and assigned first to the Naval Academy as a navigation and physics instructor, and then as the supervisory naval constructor at Bethlehem Steel Corporation Fore River Shipyard in Quincy, Massachusetts, pending admission to the Massachusetts Institute of Technology (MIT). In 1921 he received a master's degree in naval architecture from MIT, and was assigned to the Navy Construction Corps.

McKee was assigned to Portsmouth Naval Shipyard following graduation, and then transferred to the New London, Connecticut, submarine base in 1924. McKee became ship type assistant of submarine design for the Navy Bureau of Construction and Repair in Washington from 1926 to 1930, where he directed the design of USS Dolphin from which evolved the successful fleet submarines of World War II. McKee served as new construction superintendent at the Philadelphia Naval Shipyard from 1930 to 1934 and as hull superintendent at the Mare Island Naval Shipyard from 1934 to 1938. In the latter post, he oversaw introduction of the all-welded pressure hull techniques pioneered while building USS Sturgeon.

Captain McKee worked in submarine planning, design and construction as the Design Superintendent of the Portsmouth Naval Shipyard from 1938 to 1945, and was awarded a Legion of Merit for his service there. His accomplishments at Portsmouth included receipt of a Letter of Commendation from the Secretary of the Navy for participation in the rescue and salvage of USS Squalus in 1939, receipt of the Linnard Foundation award in 1940, and implementation the pressure hull improvements allowing Balao-class submarines to safely dive to 600 feet (180 m), rather than the nominal 300-foot (91 m) depth limitation for Gato-class submarines.

In 1945, he joined the staff of Commander Service Force, Pacific Fleet, as senior assistant fleet maintenance officer aboard USS Mount McKinley. Mount McKinley was anchored at Kerama Retto, where Captain McKee was given primary responsibility for inspecting ships damaged during the Battle of Okinawa, and deciding which ones should be repaired. He was awarded a Bronze Star, and also a Gold Star in lieu of a second Legion of Merit for this assignment.

Captain McKee was promoted to commodore and took command of the Philadelphia Naval Shipyard following VJ-Day. He retired from active duty of July 1, 1947, and was advanced to rear admiral on the basis of his combat decorations. Following retirement, McKee worked as a research and design engineer for the Electric Boat Division of the General Dynamics corporation in Connecticut until 1961 and as a senior technical advisor until 1974. He was awarded the David W. Taylor Medal of the Society of Naval Architects and Engineers in 1956.

He died unexpectedly on January 24, 1976, during surgery in New York City.

== Namesake ==
The submarine tender USS McKee (AS-41) is named for him.
