= Lockheed Shipbuilding and Construction Company =

Defunct shipyard in Seattle, Washington

Coordinates: 47.5766°N 122.3581°W

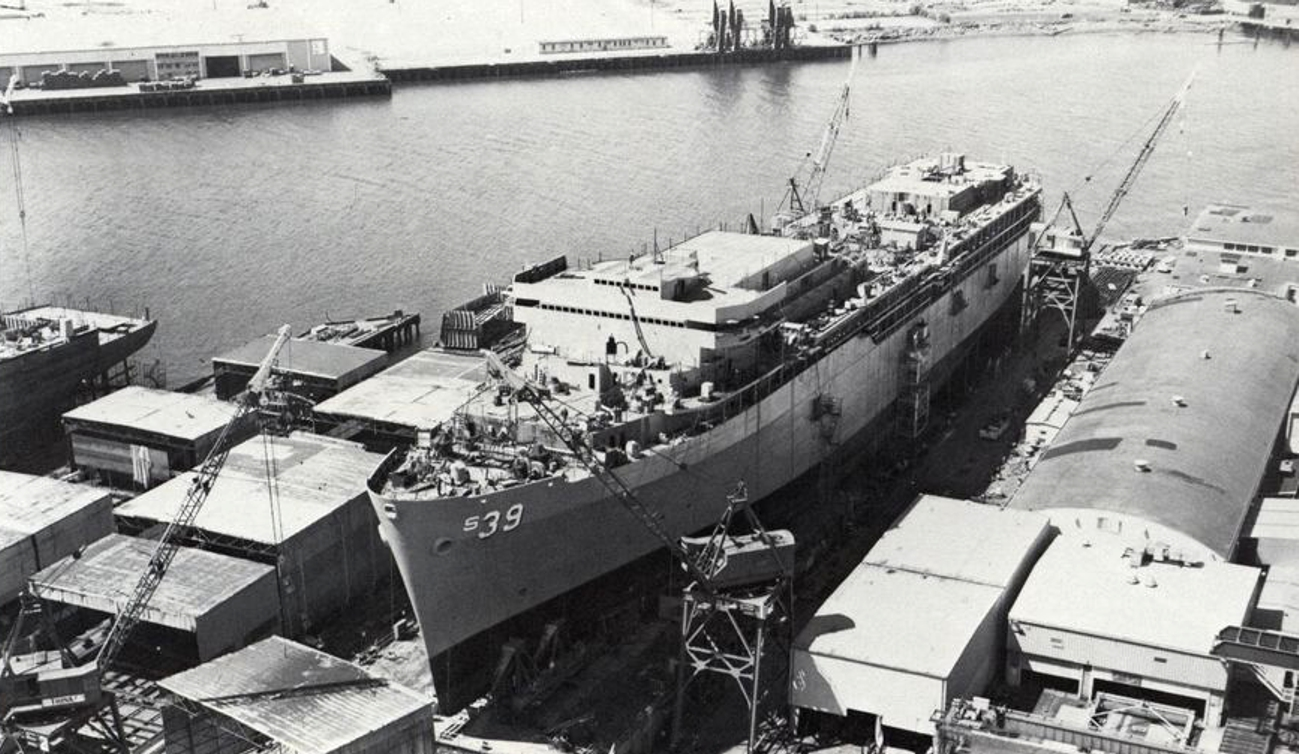
- USS Emory S. Land (AS-39) under construction at Lockheed Shipbuilding
- Industry: Shipbuilding
- Predecessor: Puget Sound Bridge and Dredging Company
- Founded: 1959
- Defunct: 1988
- Headquarters: Seattle, Washington, U.S.
- Parent: Lockheed Corporation

Lockheed Shipbuilding and Construction Company (also known as Lockheed Shipbuilding) was a shipyard in Seattle, Washington, with Yard 1 on Harbor Island and Yard 2 at what is now Jack Block Park at Seattle Terminal 5, both at the mouth of the West Waterway of Duwamish River. Yard 1 was founded in 1898 as the Puget Sound Bridge and Dredging Company, the company that built Harbor Island, and it was purchased by Lockheed in 1959. Yard 2 began operation in 1943 to build ships for the U.S. Navy. The shipyard was permanently closed in 1988; Yard 2 was sold in 1989, and Yard 1 was sold in 1997, both to Port of Seattle.

== History ==
The Lockheed Shipyard Operable Unit consisted of an 18-acre (73,000 m^{2}) shipyard facility located on the west side of Harbor Island at 2929 16th Avenue Southwest (Yard 1) and a 45-acre (180,000 m^{2}) shipyard on the North end of Terminal 5 at 2801 SW Florida St (Yard 2). The Lockheed Shipyard was a shipbuilding facility from the 1930s until 1988. Yard 1 was bounded on the north by Southwest Lander Street, on the east by 16th Avenue Southwest, on the south by the Fisher Mill property, and the west by the West Waterway of the Duwamish River and Yard 2 was bordered by Elliott Bay on the north, the Harbor Island West Waterway Operable Unit on the east, Pacific Sound Resources (PSR) Marine Sediment Unit on the west, and the Port of Seattle Terminal 5 to the south.

In the 1960s the shipyard built several of the initial ferries after the formation of the Alaska Marine Highway.

Lockheed constructed several Knox-class frigates for the United States Navy in the late 1960s and early 1970s. These ships included USS Rathburne, USS Reasoner, USS Stein, USS Bagley, and USS Robert E. Peary.

Beginning in the mid-1960s and extending into 1971, Lockheed built and delivered seven landing platform dockships (LPDs) of the Cleveland and Trenton classes for the US Navy. These were USS Denver, USS Juneau, USS Coronado, USS Shreveport, USS Nashville, USS Trenton, and USS Ponce.

Between 1971 and 1977, Lockheed built two Polar-class icebreakers for the US Coast Guard.

Lockheed won the largest shipbuilding contract in its history in 1974, when the US Navy ordered two submarine tenders to support the Los Angeles-class nuclear submarines. A subsequent order announced with launch of the lead ship, USS Emory S. Land in 1977, added a third ship to the class. Emory S. Land and USS Frank Cable joined the fleet in 1979, with USS McKee joining in 1981.

In 1978, Lockheed won the contract to construct USS Whidbey Island, an amphibious support transport ship. Lockheed delivered the Whidbey Island-class ships USS Germantown and USS Fort McHenry in 1986 and 1987 respectively.

== See also ==
- Category:Ships built by Lockheed Shipbuilding and Construction Company
- Huntington Ingalls Industries

== Archives ==
- Robert "Bob" Coder Lockheed Shipbuilding Company Lockout Scrapbook. 1986-1987. 0.42 cubic feet (1 box). At the Labor Archives of Washington, University of Washington Libraries Special Collections. Contains records from one of 13 unions that were locked out by Lockheed Shipbuilding Company in 1986-1987.
