= Lawrence York Spear =

- Born: October 23, 1870; Warren, Ohio
- Died: September 9, 1950 (aged 79); Groton, Connecticut
- Employer: Electric Boat Company

Lawrence York Spear (23 October 1870 – 9 September 1950) was an American naval officer and businessman who spent the majority of his career working for the Electric Boat Company.

== Biography ==
Born in Warren, Ohio, Spear graduated from the United States Naval Academy in Annapolis, Maryland in 1890. Lieutenant Spear went to Scotland to attend the University of Glasgow. After returning, he was asked to inspect and oversee the projects that were taking place at several shipyards across America. One of those shipyards was the Crescent Shipyard of Elizabeth, New Jersey, where the United States Navy's first submarines were built by John P. Holland's Holland Torpedo Boat Company. Later on, this company changed its name when Isaac Rice merged his other holdings (Electric Storage and Electro-Dynamic) with Holland's to create the Electric Boat Company.

In 1902 Spear resigned his Navy commission and joined Electric Boat as a naval constructor He was appointed vice-president when Holland resigned in April 1904. Spear served as president from 1942 to 1947, running the company during World War II, when it was a leading producer of submarines. He served as chairman of the board from 1947 until his death on 9 September 1950. Electric Boat changed its name to General Dynamics in 1952 under the company's new chairman and CEO, John Jay Hopkins.

== Honors ==
The submarine tender USS L. Y. Spear (AS-36), built by the General Dynamics Shipbuilding Division in Quincy, Massachusetts, was named after him.
