= Retention Excellence Award =

Usa navy award

- Awarded for: Sustaining superior levels of military retention.
- Presented by: United States Department of the Navy
- Status: Currently awarded

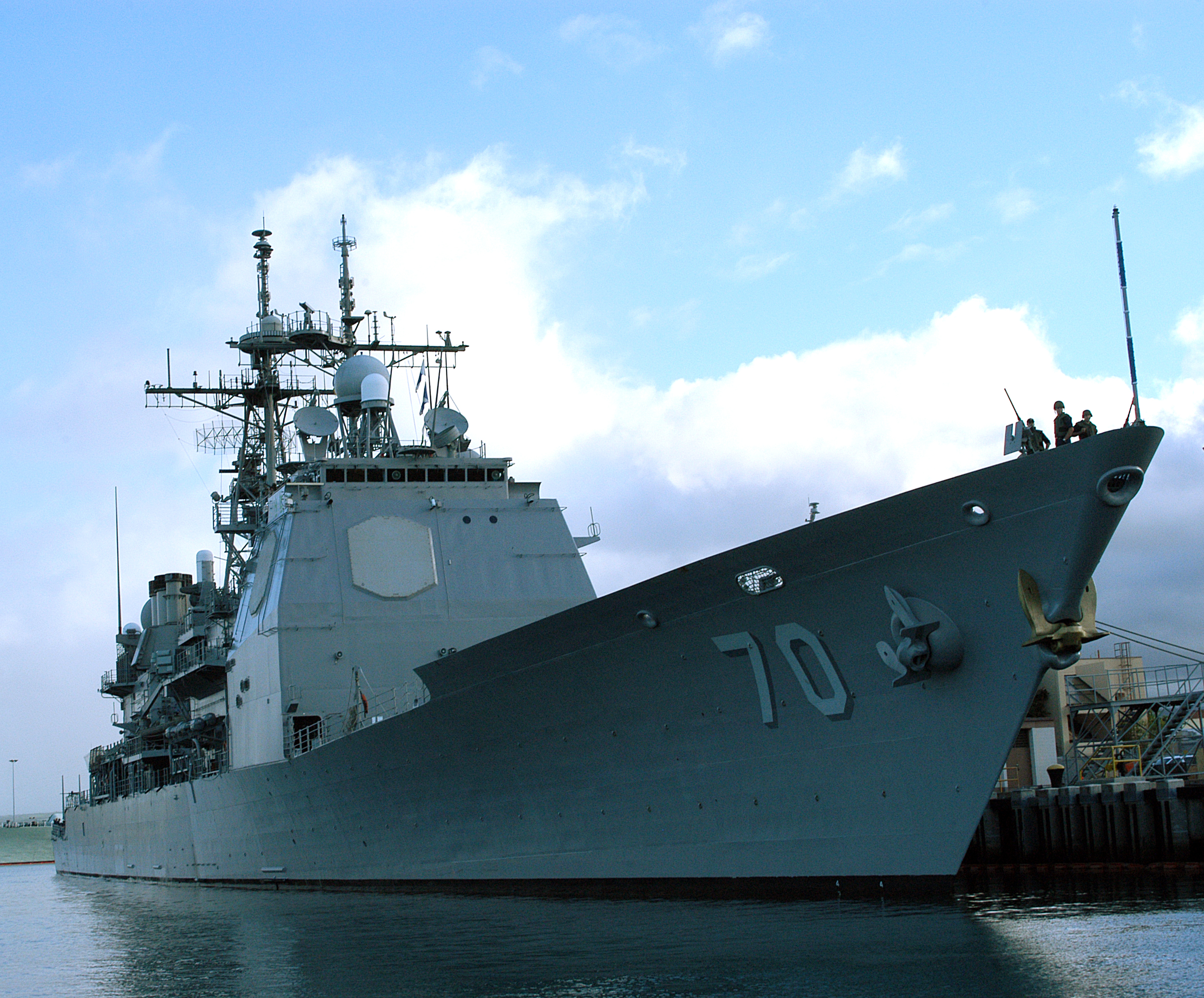
USS Lake Erie (CG-70) displaying her golden bow anchor pierside at Naval Station Pearl Harbor, Hawaii.

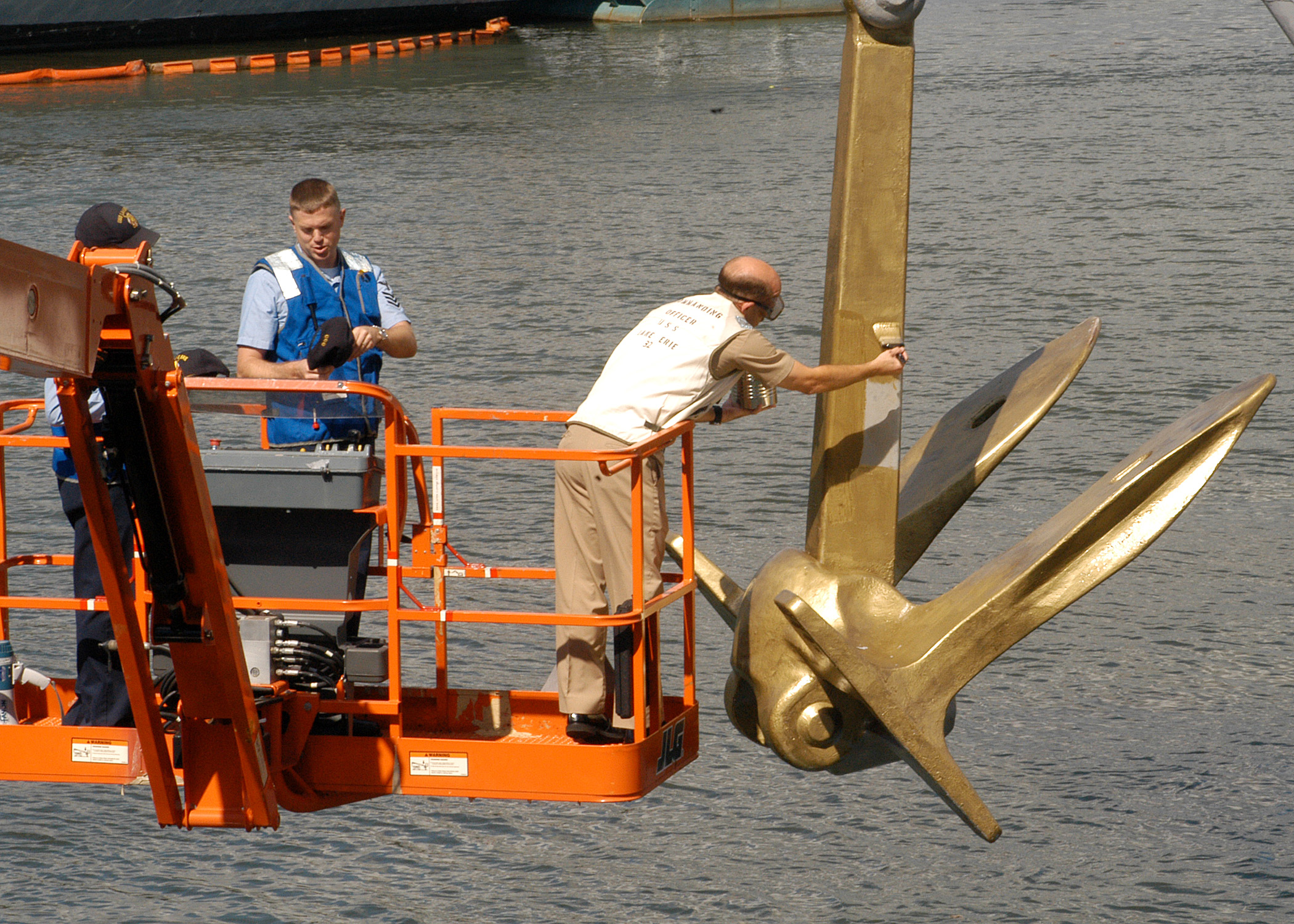
The commanding officer of USS Lake Erie (CG-70), Captain Scott Anhalt, applies gold paint to one of the ship's anchors.

The Retention Excellence Award (previously known as the Golden Anchor Award) is an award given by the United States Department of the Navy for sustaining superior levels of military retention. The award was established by the United States Fleet Forces Command through the Fleet Retention Excellence Program. Deployable Navy ships are authorized to paint their anchors gold as a symbol of earning the award.
