= USS L. Y. Spear =

Tender of the United States Navy

USS L. Y. Spear (AS-36)
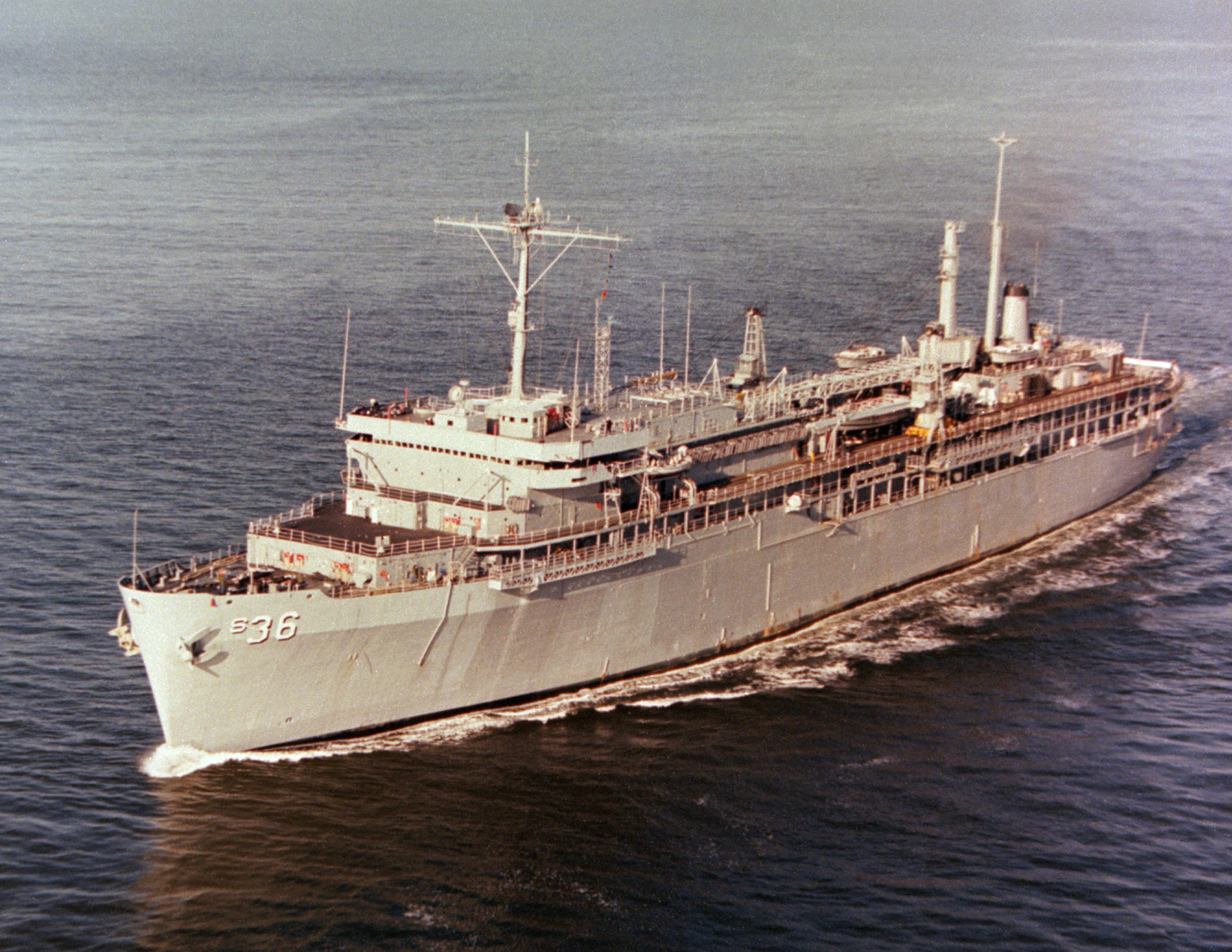
- USS L. Y. Spear in 1983

History

United States
- Name: USS L. Y. Spear (AS-36)
- Namesake: Lawrence York Spear
- Builder: General Dynamics Quincy Shipbuilding Division
- Laid down: 5 May 1966
- Launched: 7 September 1967
- Acquired: 11 February 1970
- Commissioned: 28 February 1970
- Decommissioned: 6 September 1996
- Stricken: 3 May 1999
- Fate: Sold to ESCO Marine, Brownsville, Texas, on 9 July 2010 for scrapping

General characteristics
- Displacement: 22,640 tons
- Length: 644 ft (196 m)
- Beam: 29 ft (8.8 m)
- Draft: 57 ft (17 m)
- Propulsion: steam turbine engine, 1 propeller
- Speed: 20 knots
- Complement: 1,338
- Armament: four 0.5 in (12.7 mm) mg, 4 20mm Cannon

USS L. Y. Spear (AS-36) was the lead ship of her class of submarine tenders, in service to the United States Navy from 1970 through 1996.

== Etymology ==
She was named for Lawrence York Spear, a former Navy lieutenant who played an integral role in submarine design at Electric Boat Company before and during World War II.

== History ==
L. Y. Spear was laid down by General Dynamics Quincy Shipbuilding Division at Quincy, Massachusetts, on 5 May 1966; launched on 7 September 1967; sponsored by the wife of Vice Admiral Schade, Commander, Submarine Force, Atlantic Fleet; and commissioned on 28 February 1970.

Designed primarily to service nuclear attack submarines, L. Y. Spear was assigned to Submarine Squadron 6 with Norfolk, Virginia, as her home port. She had the capability to provide logistic and technical support for as many as 12 submarines and service four of them alongside simultaneously.

L. Y. Spear was decommissioned on 6 September 1996 and struck from the Navy Register on 3 May 1999. She was berthed at the Norfolk Naval Shipyard in Portsmouth, Virginia, from 1999 till 2010. On 9 July 2010, a contract to dismantle L. Y. Spear was issued to ESCO Marine, Brownsville, Texas. She departed the Norfolk Naval Shipyard at the end of August 2010 and was completely dismantled by 14 July 2011.

The mess deck scene from the movie The Death of Ocean View Park (1979) was filmed aboard the L. Y. Spear.

=== Awards ===
- Navy Meritorious Unit Commendation – (Apr-Jul 1980, Feb 1984-May 1986, Jun 1993-Sep 1994, Oct 1994-Sep 1996)
- Navy E Ribbon – (1979, 1983, 1984, 1990, 1991, 1993)
- Navy Expeditionary Medal – (Apr-Jul 1980)
- Southwest Asia Service Medal – (Aug-Nov 1991) Gulf War
- Captain Edward F. Ney Memorial Award – (1974)
