= Kandahar bombing =

Kandahar bombing may refer to:

- Bombing of Kandahar (2001)
- 2008 Kandahar bombing
- 2009 Kandahar bombing
- 2021 Kandahar bombing
- 2024 Kandahar New Kabul Bank bombing
