= 2015 Kandahar airport attack =

Taliban attack in Kandahar, Afghanistan

Kandahar airport attack
- Part of War in Afghanistan (2001–2021)
- Location of Kandahar Province in Afghanistan
- Location: Kandahar, Kandahar Province Islamic Republic of Afghanistan
- Date: 8–10 December 2015
- Attack type: Siege
- Deaths: 50 (+ 11 attackers)
- Injuries: 35
- Perpetrator: Taliban

Several militants penetrated the security of Kandahar Airfield on Tuesday, 8 December 2015, barricading themselves in an old school building, and sparking a battle with Afghan soldiers that lasted for many hours. The Afghan Defense Ministry stated that 50 civilians and members of the security forces had been killed, along with 11 attackers, while at least 35 people were injured. The Taliban claimed responsibility. The attack was co-ordinated just hours after a "Message to Obama" was posted on a video site by the Taliban, warning U.S. troops of upcoming attack.

== See also ==
- 2008 Kandahar bombing
- 2009 Kandahar bombing
- Mufti Mohammad Sayeed
- Indian Airlines Flight 814
