= Bombing of Kandahar (2001) =

2001 military operations in Afghanistan

Coordinates: 31°37′N 65°43′E

- Part of the War in Afghanistan
Date	October 7, 2001
Location	In and around Kandahar, Afghanistan
Result	Successful American airstrikes in the city, Taliban strengthening position within city.
Territorial changes	Reinforcement of Taliban forces, leads to Fall of Kandahar

Belligerents
United States; United Kingdom	Taliban al-Qaeda

Commanders and leaders
Tommy Franks	Mullah Omar

Strength
Unknown	1,000+ (est.)

Casualties and losses
Unknown	Unknown

The 2001 Bombing of Kandahar was a series of military operations conducted in and around Kandahar, Afghanistan, during October 2001, as part of the start of the United States' military operations in Afghanistan.

== Chronology ==
Following the 2001 September 11 attacks, the United States and its allies launched the global war on terror, starting with assaults on key Taliban positions within Afghanistan.

On October 7, 2001, at 6:30 pm local time, the first wave of attack against the Taliban was launched. A group of United States Air Force (USAF) bombers consisting of five B-1s and ten B-52s took off from Diego Garcia in the Indian Ocean. They were complemented by twenty-five United States Navy (USN) F-14s and F/A-18s strike aircraft from the aircraft carriers USS Carl Vinson and USS Enterprise in the North Arabian Sea. The Royal Air Force (RAF) and USAF provided L-1011s, KC-135 and KC-10s to supply en route aerial refuelings to the USN aircraft. Flown in from Whiteman Air Force Base, Missouri, two B-2 Spirits also participated in the attack, as did the EA-6B Prowler electronic warfare aircraft.

At 9:00 pm, USN, USAF, and Royal Navy (RN) forces launched several salvos totaling fifty Tomahawk cruise missiles against Taliban military and communications facilities and suspected terrorist training camps. The timing was chosen to coincide with the arrival of the strike aircraft, which dropped a variety of bombs including Mk 82s, JDAMs, AGM-84s, AGM-154s and laser-guided bombs. According to in-country sources reporting to CNN, targets within Kandahar included Taliban strongholds, as well as the houses of Arab foreigners who worked with the Taliban regime. One of the primary targets for the airstrike in Kandahar was Mullah Omar. The attacking aircraft were met with sporadic fire from Taliban anti-aircraft artillery batteries and surface-to-air missiles. The U.S. considered the attacks, conducted against the cities of Kabul, Jalalabad and Herat, to be successful as the goal of neutralizing the Taliban's air defense was met.

To court and provide relief for the Afghan people, food and supplies were dropped into the region. Two C-17 transports delivered 37,500 daily rations by airdrop to refugees inside Afghanistan on the first day of the attack. Relief efforts faced setback, however, from Taliban interference. World Food Programme storehouses in Kandahar were raided and surrendered to Taliban soldiers, who "seized about 7,000 tons of food." Hoping to avoid a backlash by civilians, the USAF deployed an EC-130E propeller aircraft to broadcast a message that the Taliban and its allies were the only targets of the attacks, not civilians.

== Aftermath ==
Following the successful airstrikes against the city, and after rapid setbacks experienced by Taliban forces across the country, much of the military might held directly and indirectly by Mullah Omar was consolidated in the city of Kandahar. On November 18, the United States enlisted the help of Gul Agha Sherzai, an anti-Taliban commander and previous Governor of Kandahar Province. On November 25, the U.S. airlifted a contingent of 750 Marines from the 15th Marine Expeditionary Unit to create a forward base at Camp Rhino, located 100 miles (160 km) south of Kandahar. At this time, the allied commanders were also finalizing the decision to send British paratroopers from the 2nd Battalion, The Parachute Regiment. These events set the stage for the taking of Kandahar and Taliban surrender on December 7.

== See also ==
- 2001 in Afghanistan
