= Bob Blackman (disambiguation) =

Bob Blackman (born 1956) is a British Conservative politician.

Bob Blackman may also refer to:

- Bob Blackman (American football) (1918–2000)
- Robert Blackman (born 1943), American costume designer
- Robert R. Blackman Jr. (born 1948), United States Marine Corps general
