= Ro Atherton =

RAF officer

Rowena Atherton
- Military career
- Allegiance: United Kingdom
- Branch: Royal Air Force
- Service years: 1979 –
- Rank: Group Captain
- Commands: RAF Wittering (2006–08)
- Conflicts: War in Afghanistan

Group Captain Rowena Atherton is a former Royal Air Force (RAF) officer.

With a logistics background, Atherton joined the RAF aged 17 in 1979 and completed training at RAF Henlow.

After becoming Station Commander at RAF Wittering in 2006, Atherton banned RAF Wittering personnel from wearing uniform while off duty. This was in response to reports that personnel from the station were receiving abuse due to the wars in Iraq and Afghanistan.

Atherton deployed to Afghanistan in July 2008 as Deputy Commander Joint Force Support Headquarters.

Military offices
Preceded by Ashley Stevenson	Station Commander RAF Wittering; 2006–2008	Succeeded by Paul Higgins
