= Registan Desert =

Desert in Afghanistan

Coordinates: 30°27′12.27″N 65°24′25.58″E

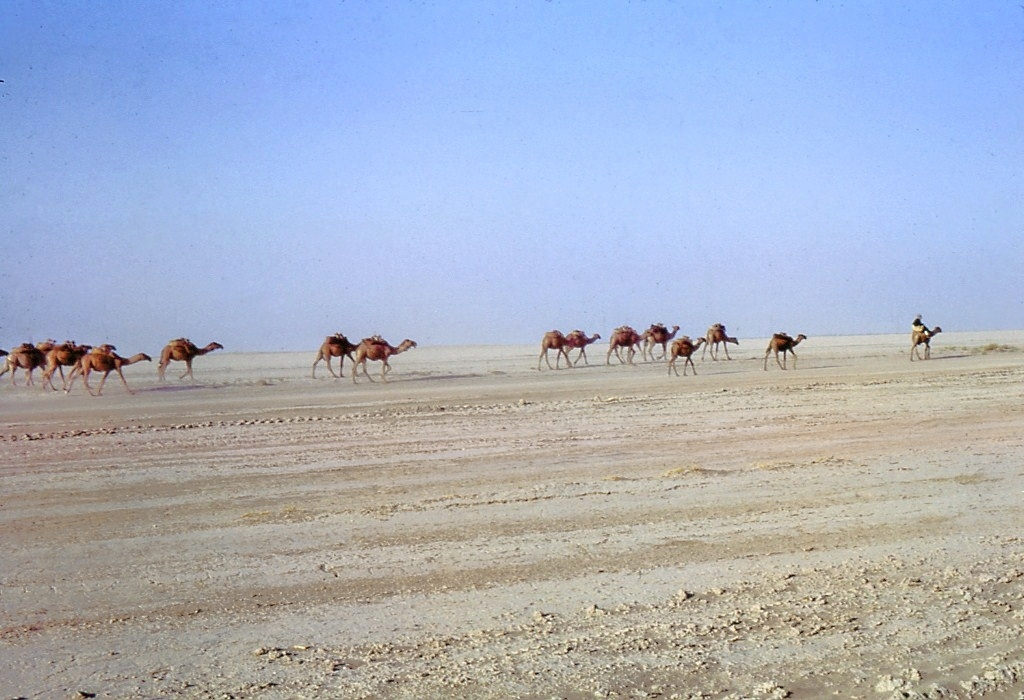
A caravan in the Registan Desert in August 1969

Location within Afghanistan

The Registan Desert (Pashto: ریگستان or Balochi: رݔکستان), also known as Sistan Desert, is an extremely arid plateau region located between Helmand and Kandahar provinces in south-eastern Afghanistan. It is a sandy desert consisting of small, red sand hills about 50–100 feet (15–30 m) high, sand-covered plains, and open rocky and clay-covered areas. The underlying base of the hills consists of partly stabilized ancient transverse dunes, reflecting a west-to-east wind and nearly unlimited sand supply. The desert is very sparsely populated by Baluch and Pashtun nomads. The desert is gradually encroaching on surrounding agricultural areas.

A severe drought in 1998 caused the displacement of approximately 100,000 nomadic people from the Registan desert region. Most of them now live in temporary settlements between the Arghandab and Helmand Rivers and Registan. A large number are also being supported by the UN in camps for internally displaced persons (IDPs) in Kandahar Province. The UN is currently seeking strategies to return the nomads to their traditional livelihood of raising livestock in Registan. The Registan Desert is migrating westward, encroaching on former agricultural areas. The United Nations Environment Programme team reports that "up to 100 villages have been submerged by windblown dust and sand". In the country's northwest, sand dunes are moving onto agricultural land, their path cleared by the loss of stabilizing vegetation due to firewood gathering and overgrazing. The UNEP team observed sand dunes nearly 50 feet (15 meters) high blocking roads, forcing residents to establish new routes.

== See also ==
- Balochistan, Afghanistan
- Geography of Afghanistan
- Camp Rhino
