= Ashley Stevenson =

British military officer (born 1958)

Ashley David Stevenson
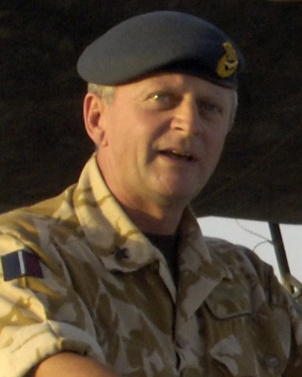
- Stevenson in 2007
- Born: 30 September 1958 (age 68)
- Military career
- Allegiance: United Kingdom
- Branch: Royal Air Force
- Service years: 1981–2013
- Rank: Air Commodore
- Commands: No. 83 Expeditionary Air Group (2011–12); Royal Air Force College Cranwell (2008–10); Kandahar Airfield (2007–08); RAF Wittering (2005–06); No. 3 (Fighter) Squadron (1998–00)
- Conflicts: War in Afghanistan
- Awards: Commander of the Order of the British Empire; Queen's Commendation for Brave Conduct

Air Commodore Ashley David Stevenson, CBE, ADC (born 30 September 1958) is a retired senior Royal Air Force (RAF) officer and a former Commandant of Royal Air Force College Cranwell.

== Military career ==
Stevenson was commissioned into the Flying Branch as a flying officer from the ranks of the RAF on 25 February 1982. He conducted his flying training in the USA on the T-37 and T-38 aircraft, completing using the Hawk in the UK.

He was awarded the Queen's Commendation for Brave Conduct in 1992 for his actions in an ejection situation following a bird strike of his two-seat Harrier T.4 on 25 September 1991, where he rescued his rear seat passenger (the first woman to eject from a British combat jet) after she landed in the aircraft's burning wreckage. This was Stevenson's second ejection from a Harrier after he had ejected from a GR.5 on 17 October 1990.

As Officer Commanding No. 3 (Fighter) Squadron, Wing Commander Stevenson commanded the detachment of Harrier GR.7 aircraft deployed during the Sierra Leone crisis, the first operation conducted by the combined RAF/Royal Navy Joint Force Harrier.

Stevenson served as Station Commander RAF Wittering for two years and, on promotion to air commodore, was appointed Air Commodore Force Development Headquarters in No. 1 Group on 27 November 2006.

Stevenson was appointed to the newly created NATO post of Commander Kandahar Airfield, Afghanistan in July 2007. He then became Commandant Royal Air Force College Cranwell and Director of Recruiting in April 2008.

He was appointed a Commander of the Order of the British Empire (CBE) in the 2012 Birthday Honours.

Military offices
Preceded by A.F.P. Dezonie	Officer Commanding No. 3 (Fighter) Squadron; 1998–2000	Succeeded by Stuart Atha
Preceded by M. Jenkins	Station Commander RAF Wittering; 2005–2006	Succeeded by Ro Atherton
Preceded by R.I. McAlpine	Air Commodore Force Development Headquarters; 2006–2007	Succeeded by Andy Sudlow
New creation	Commander Kandahar Airfield, Afghanistan; 2007–2008	Succeeded by Bob Judson
Preceded by R.B. Cunningham	Commandant Royal Air Force College Cranwell; 2008–2010	Succeeded by Paul Oborn
