= Kandahar International Airport =

Airport in Afghanistan

Kandahar International Airport Pashto: د کندهار نړيوال هوايي ډګر
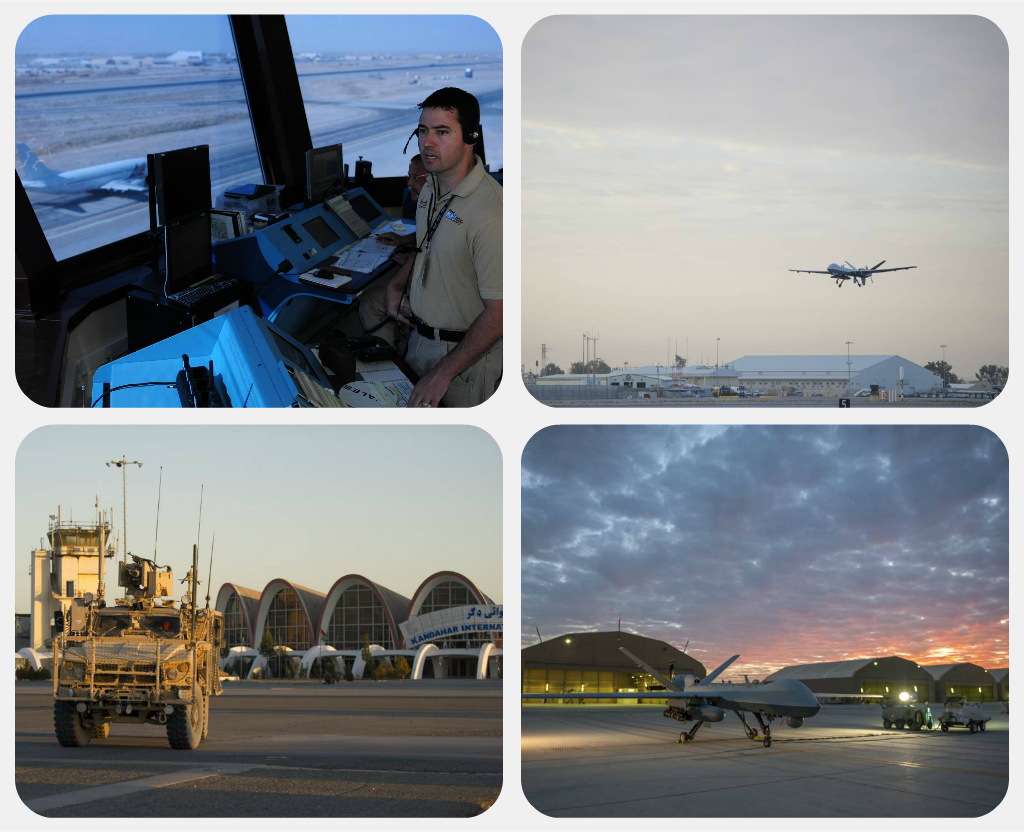
- Photos captured during NATO's control
- IATA: KDH; ICAO: OAKN

Summary
- Airport type: Public / Military
- Owner: Government of Afghanistan
- Operator: GAAC Holding
- Serves: Southern Afghanistan
- Location: Daman District, Kandahar Province, Afghanistan
- Built: 1962
- Elevation AMSL: 3,338 ft (1,017 m)
- Coordinates: 31°30′21″N 065°50′52″E

Map
- Location in Afghanistan

Runways
Direction	Length		Surface
Direction	m	ft	Surface
05/23	3,200	10,499	Asphalt

Helipads
Number	Length		Surface
Number	m	ft	Surface
Pad	370	1,214	Paved
- Sources: Landings.com, AIP Afghanistan

Kandahar International Airport (Pashto: د کندهار نړيوال هوايي ډګر IATA: KDH, ICAO: OAKN), also referred to as Kandahar Airfield (KAF), is located in the Daman District of Kandahar Province in Afghanistan, about 9 NM (17 km; 10 mi) southeast from the city of Kandahar. It has served as the nation's second main international airport and as one of the largest main operating bases, capable of housing up to 250 aircraft of different sizes. The current head of the airport is Feda Muhammad Nezami. His predecessor was Maulvi Fathullah Mansour.

The airport was designed and built by American engineers in the early 1960s. It was occupied by the Soviets during the 1980s Soviet–Afghan War, as well as serving as the Afghan Army's 665th Commando Brigade headquarters. Following their withdrawal the airport remained in control of Mohammad Najibullah's government until he stepped down in 1992. Thereafter, local military commanders took control of the airport until the American invasion in late 2001. It was also the site of Airstan incident in 1995, as well as the Indian Airlines Flight 814 incident in 1999.

Since 2007, the airport has been repaired and expanded. Its runway can support all types of aircraft, including a Boeing C-17 Globemaster III or an Antonov An-225 Mriya. The airport can be used for both military and civilian flights. The military section of the airport is maintained by the Afghan Armed Forces. The Afghan National Police provides security inside and outside the civilian terminal of the airport. In April 2026 work on a new passenger terminal began.

Other nearby airports to Kandahar are Tarinkot Airport in neighboring Uruzgan Province to the north, Qalat Airport in Zabul Province to the northeast, and Bost Airport in Lashkar Gah to the west.

== History ==
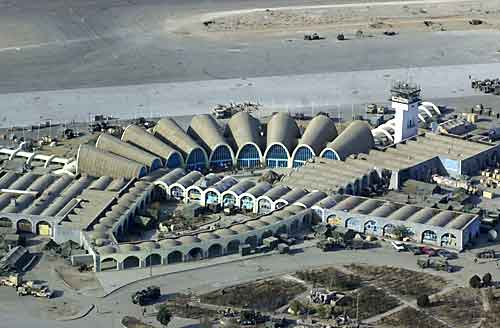
The airport was designed by American engineers in the early 1960s

Kandahar International Airport was originally built in the early 1960s by American engineers and Afghan workers. The United States provided US$15 million in aid. The airfield itself was completed in 1962 by Morrison Knudsen, which was contracted by the United States Agency for International Development (USAID). Bearing a great resemblance to typical Afghan architecture of the time, its original purpose was a safe refueling stop for long-range piston engined aircraft traveling between Europe and Southeast Asia. However, with the advent of jet aircraft, such stops were no longer necessary, and the airport saw little use.

Some speculate that since the airport was designed as a military base, it is likely that the United States intended to use it in case there was a war between the United States and the former USSR. While the Americans were busy building the Kandahar Airport, the Soviets were busy in the north, building the Kabul Airport.

=== Soviet invasion and civil war ===
During the Soviet occupation of Afghanistan, the airfield was used intensively by the Soviet Air Forces, both as logistical facility for flying in troops and supplies and as a base for launching airstrikes against local Mujahideen groups.

Fighting in the Kandahar area was particularly intense. However, Kandahar airport was left relatively untouched and its main building was largely intact at the end of the war. The airstrip did suffer extensive damage that was subsequently repaired by the United Nations in the mid-1990s to support humanitarian flights.

The airport came into the public eye during the tense drama that was played out when Pakistani terrorists belonging to Harkat-ul-Mujahideen, who hijacked and landed Indian Airlines Flight 814 on the airfield in December 1999.

=== War in Afghanistan ===
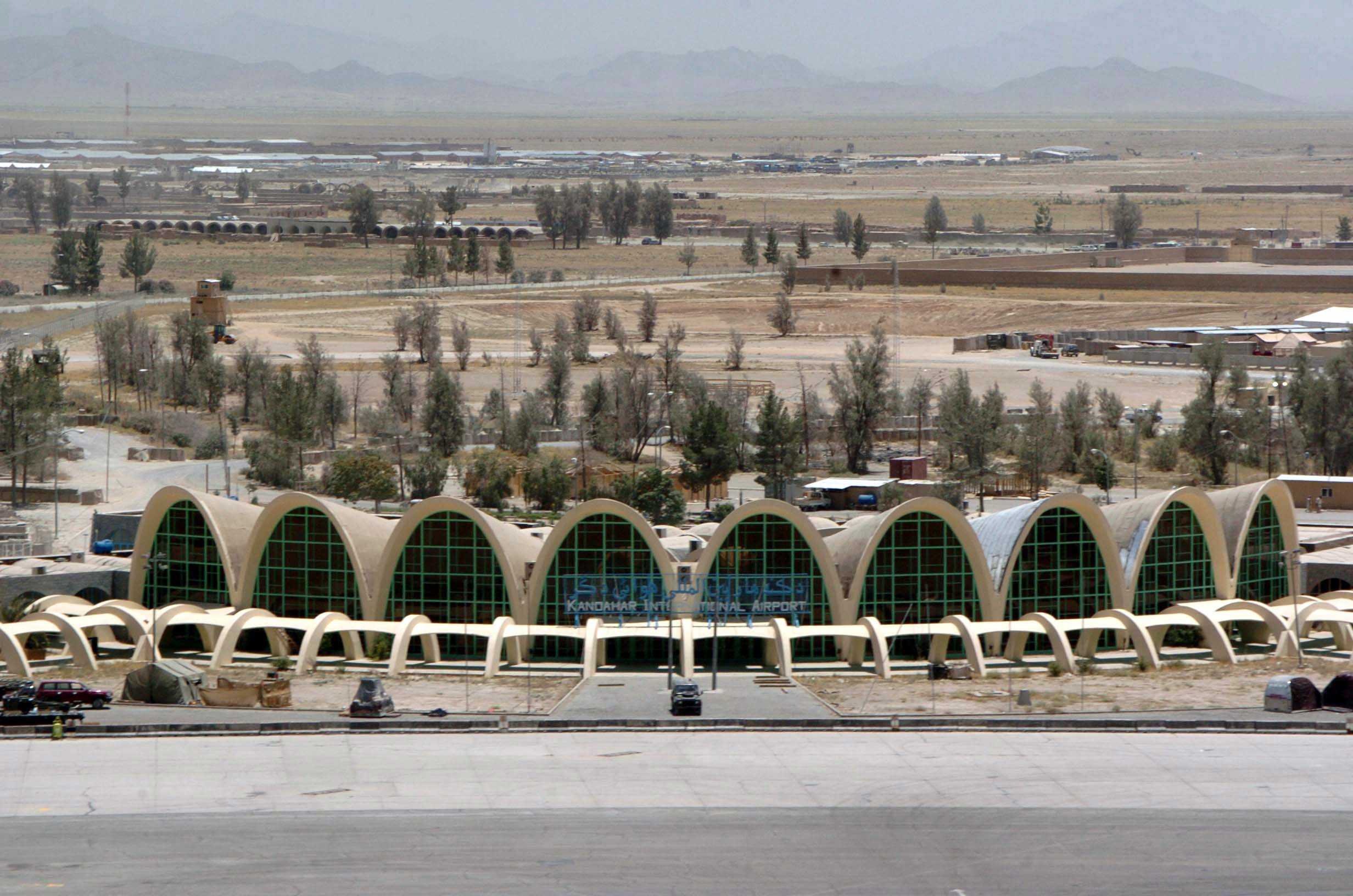
Aerial view of the airport in 2005

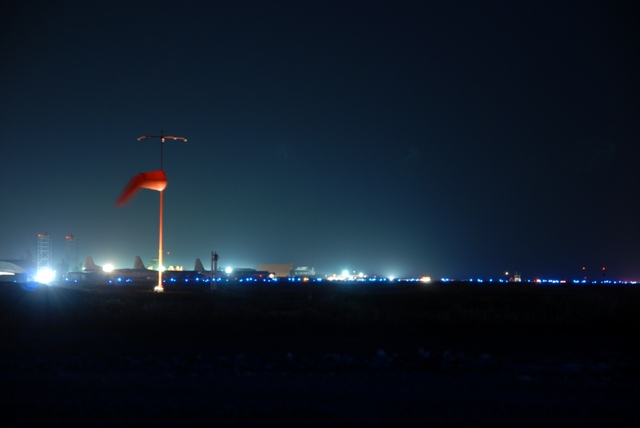
Night view of the airport in 2007

During Operation Enduring Freedom in late 2001, Kandahar Airport was one of the first coalition bases established in Afghanistan. It was secured by the Light Armored Reconnaissance element of the US Marines 15th MEU and elements of the 26th MEU in mid-December 2001, just a few weeks after the first coalition footprint was established by the United States Army at Camp Rhino in the desert to the southwest. The airport was captured by an air insertion coinciding with a rapid overland push from troops based at Camp Rhino.

Major battles between the Taliban and local anti-Taliban forces had been fought at the airport just days earlier, and when coalition troops arrived there were abandoned weapons – including a BM-21 still loaded with rockets – scattered around the terminal. Australian and Canadian special forces were amongst the first coalition troops to relocate to Kandahar Airport, and by Christmas Day the US-led coalition had established a footprint of at least 1,000 troops.

A perimeter was quickly secured around the terminal building and airstrip, and initially all troops worked and lived in and around the main terminal building itself. The first spartan ablutions were established in the middle of a large rose garden out front, but shower facilities were not established for several weeks. The accommodation area began to enlarge down along the airfield to where the current military base is located, and by April the coalition presence had expanded to several thousand personnel.

The 159th Combat Aviation Brigade became the main U.S. Army Aviation unit at the airport while the 451st Air Expeditionary Wing became the main USAF unit.

As part of Operation Enduring Freedom, the Royal Air Force and Royal Navy also had based a squadron of Harrier GR7A aircraft at Kandahar Airfield to provide close air support to coalition ground forces replacing USMC AV-8Bs. After June 2009 under Operation Herrick they were replaced by a squadron of Panavia Tornado GR4 aircraft, carrying out close air support and recce missions.

The Royal Air Force also has a detachment of C130 K and J model Hercules transport aircraft from 24, 30, 47 and 70 Squadrons and its attached Engineering detachment from 24/30 and 47/70 Engineering Squadrons as part of No. 904 Expeditionary Air Wing, the squadron's home was RAF Lyneham, Wiltshire until its closure as a RAF base in late 2011 when the squadron's home station relocated to RAF Brize Norton, Oxfordshire.

Eight General Dynamics F-16 Fighting Falcon close air support fighters of the Royal Netherlands Air Force were deployed to Kandahar Airfield to support the expanded NATO operation in southern Afghanistan in late 2006.

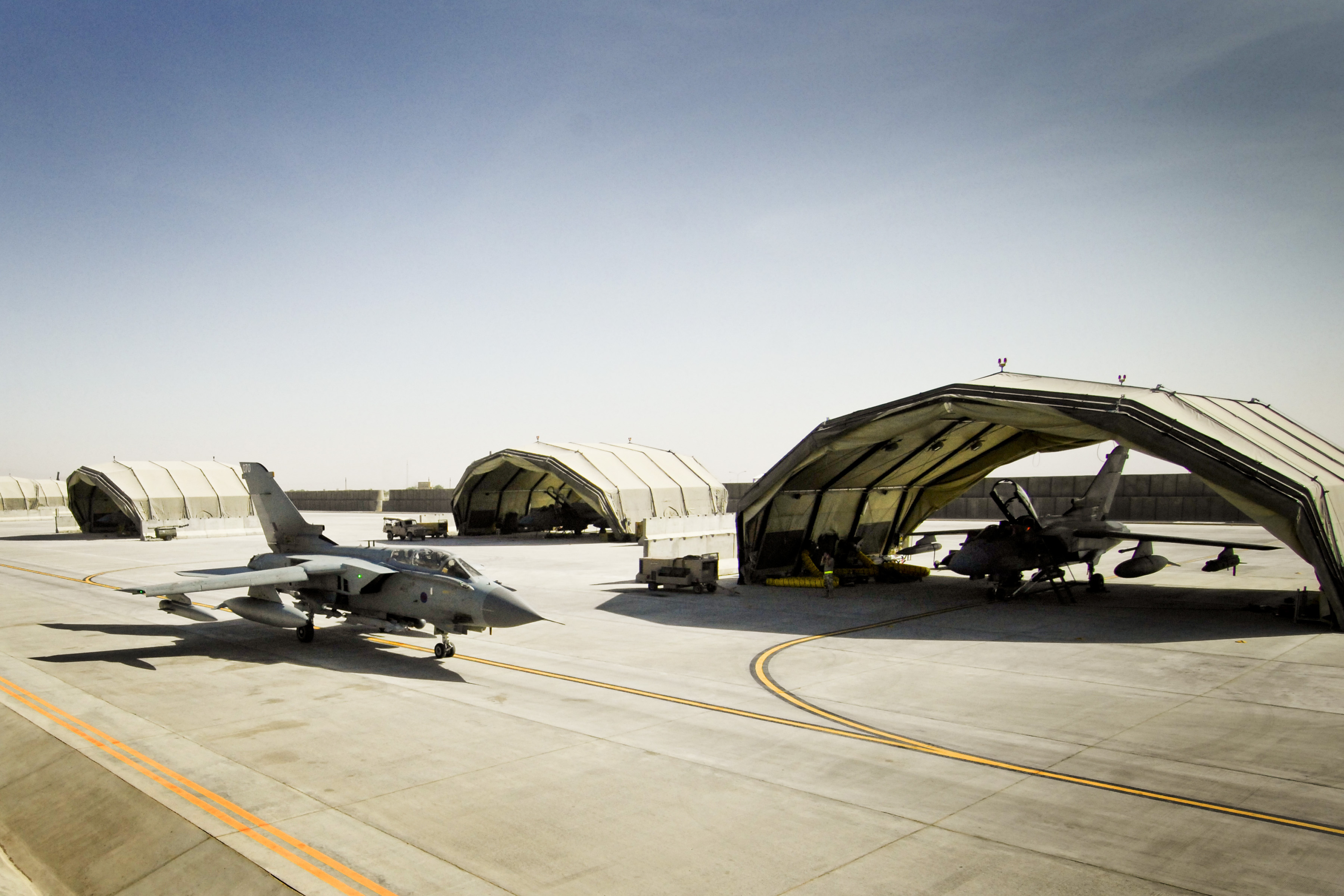
A 12 Squadron Royal Air Force Tornado GR4 taxis out towards the runway.

The Afghan government has been slow in rebuilding the facility, the vast majority of it has been reclaimed from years of neglect and damage by Soviet and Taliban soldiers. The interior gardens, pools, kitchen galley, restroom facility, and ticketing areas have been restored. With the transition of the U.S. passenger area terminal to the Afghans in 2005, the airport began to be used for civilian flights. It was used for the 2006 Hajj by Muslim pilgrims.

With the closure of Camp Julien in Kabul in November 2005, most of the Canadian Forces personnel in Afghanistan were transferred to Kandahar province. Canadian Brigadier-General David Fraser took command of the multinational brigade from its headquarters at Kandahar Airfield (KAF) in March 2006. At the same time, Canada also fielded a battle group for two successive six-month rotations, and deployed a new rotation for the Provincial Reconstruction Team (PRT) at Camp Nathan Smith in Kandahar.

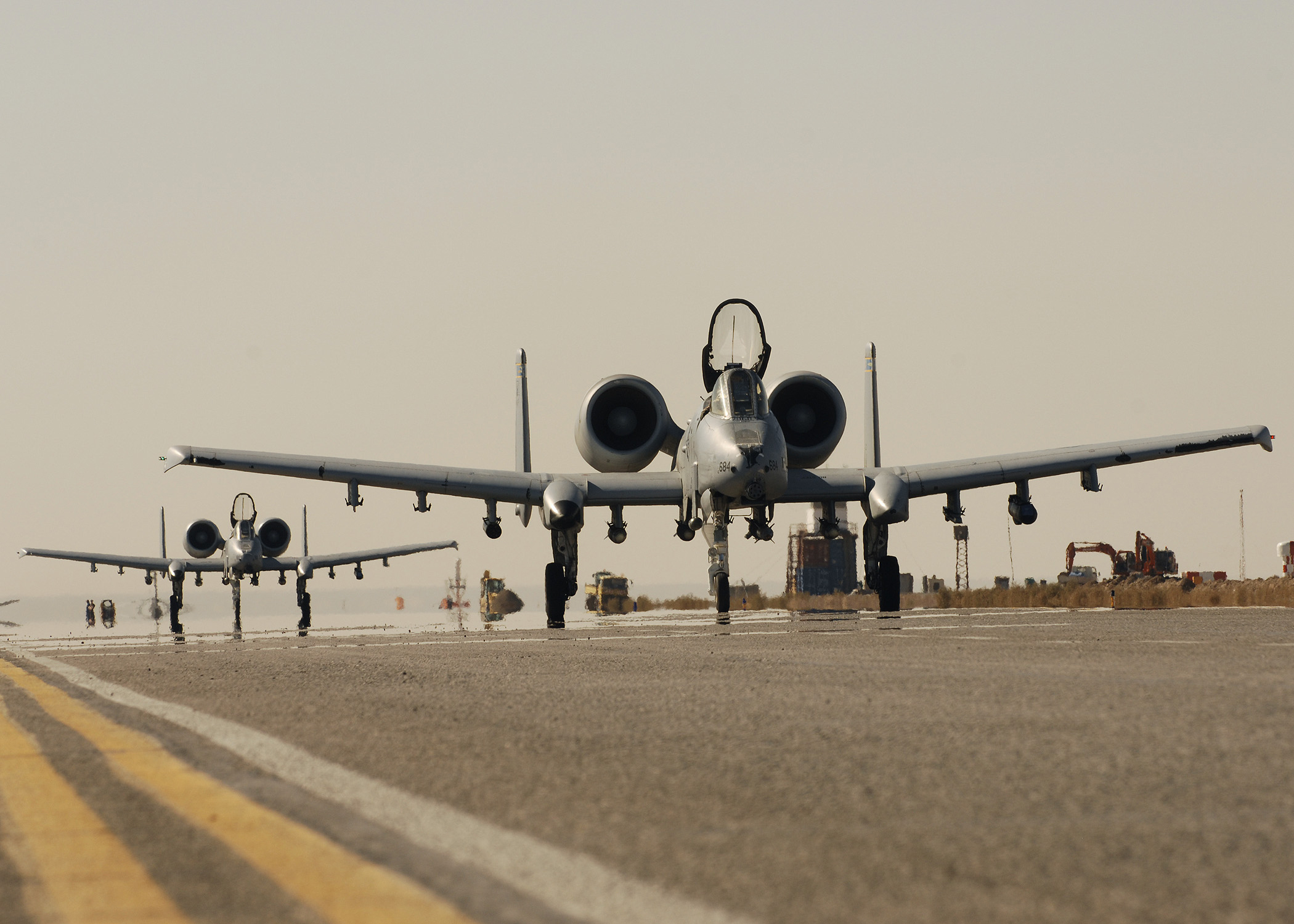
U.S. Air Force A-10C Thunderbolt II aircraft from the 354th Expeditionary Fighter Squadron taxi at the airport in 2010

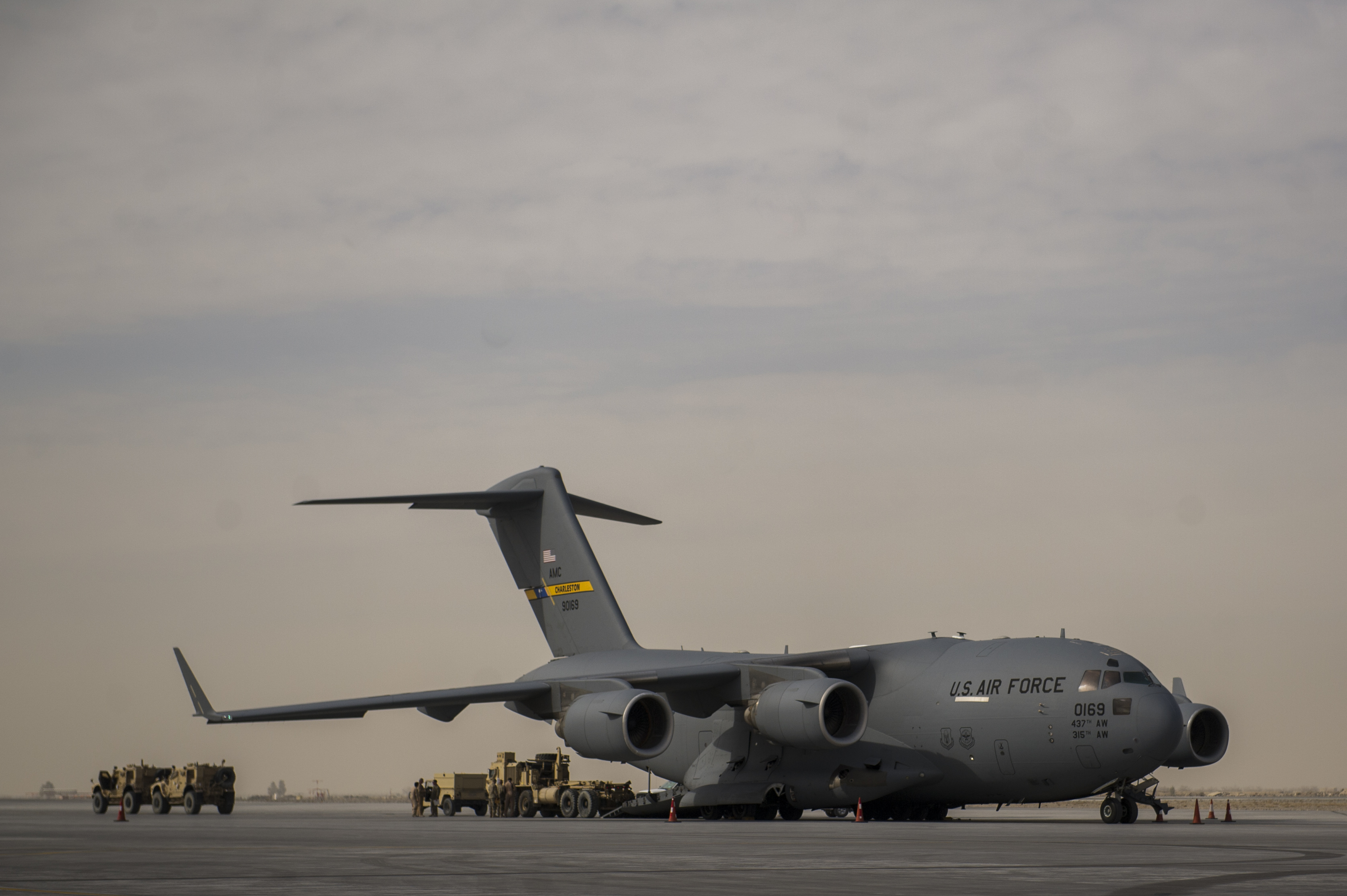
A Boeing C-17 Globemaster III aircraft with the 817th Expeditionary Airlift Squadron receiving cargo

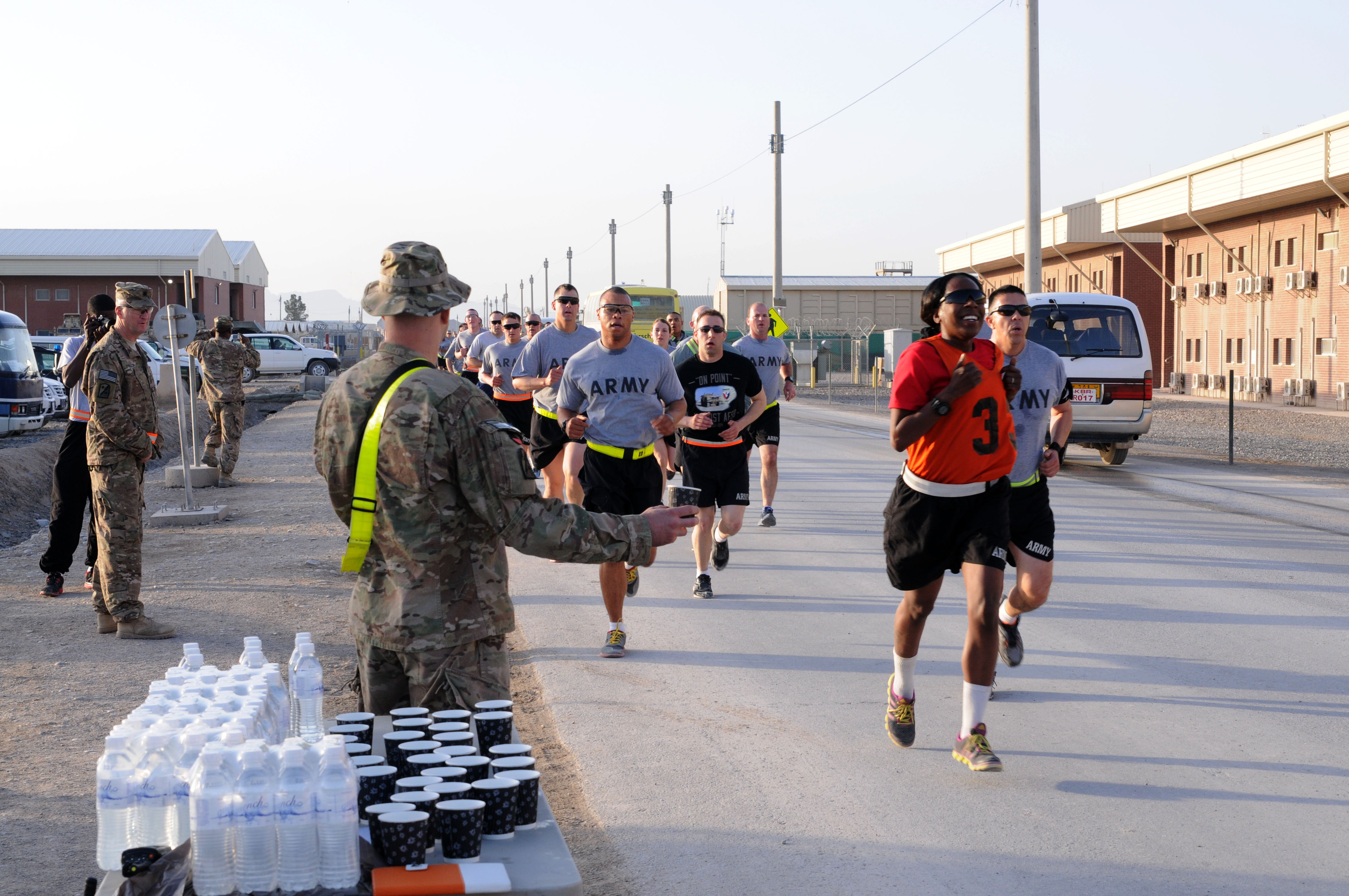
Soldiers from the 82nd Sustainment Brigade-U.S. Central Command Materiel Recovery Element

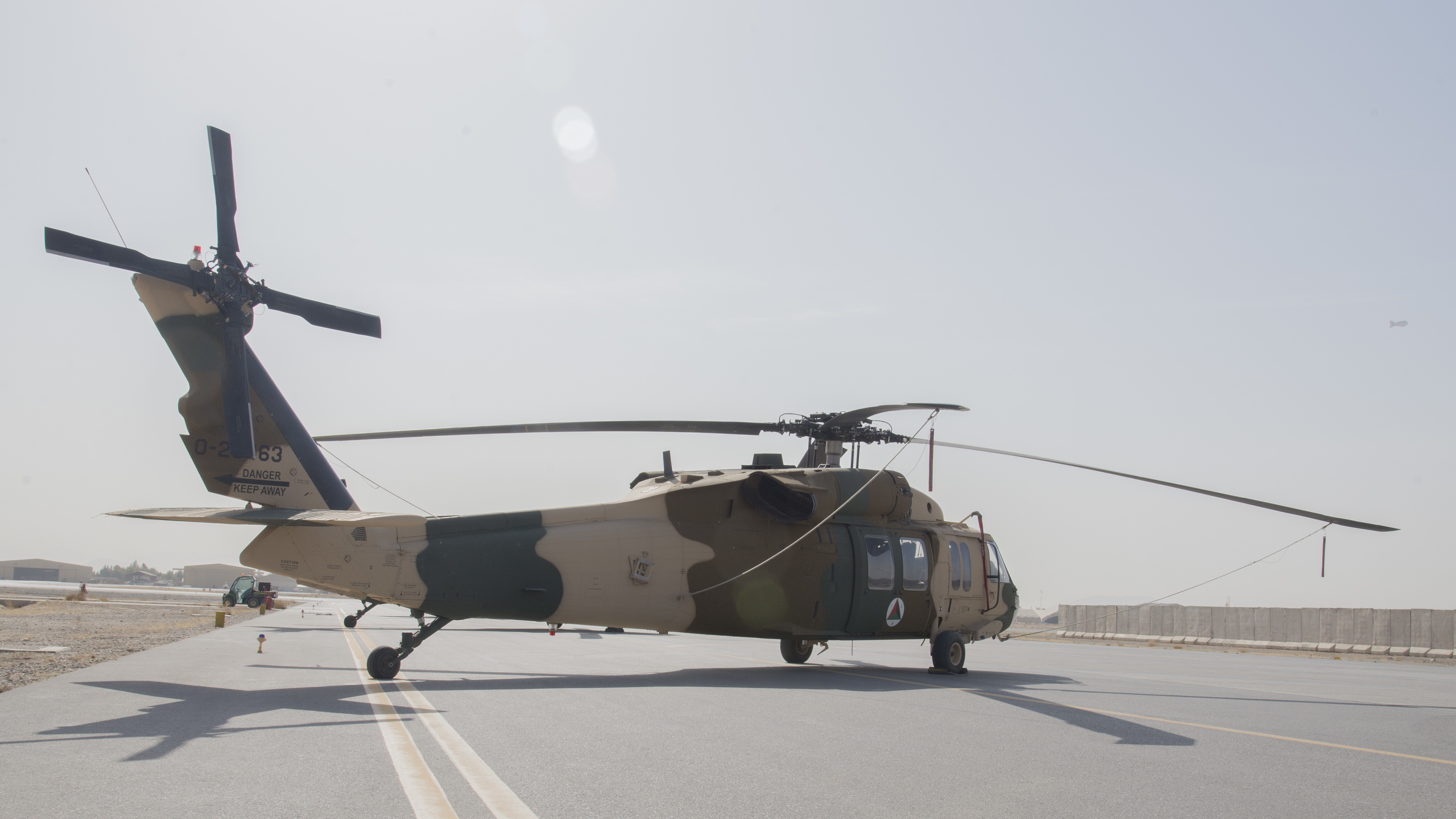
Afghan Air Force UH-60A Black Hawks

The deployments in February 2006 brought Task Force Afghanistan in Kandahar to about 2,250 personnel. The mission of TFA was to improve the security situation in the southern areas, and play a key role in the transition from the U.S.-led multinational coalition to NATO leadership. This change was made in southern Afghanistan in the summer of 2006.

Beginning in 2007, the airport was maintained by NATO under the International Security Assistance Force (ISAF) banner, although a prominent base for the US and Canadian Forces, many other Armed Forces were based there. British Forces used Kandahar as their main staging post for the south and fLee direct into the Helmand province. Fast jets and combat helicopters were also deployed as this is the main airport in the south of the country. NATO operated a major trauma hospital at the base, treating battle casualties, including Afghan civilians and enemy forces.

In July 2007, the post of Commander, Kandahar Airfield (COMKAF) was created as a NATO appointment which had been held by an officer of the Royal Air Force of OF-6 rank.

Commander, Kandahar Airfield has been held by:

- July 2007 – Air Commodore A D Stevenson
- February 2008 – Air Commodore R W Judson (exact date unknown)
- September 2008 – Acting Air Commodore A D Fryer
- July 2009 – Air Commodore M A B Brecht
- May 2010 – Air Commodore G Moulds
- November 2010 – Brigadier General Jeffrey Kendall
- November 2011 – Brigadier General Scott Dennis
- November 2012 – Brigadier General John Dolan
- November 2013 – Brigadier General Michael Fantini

During late September 2007 a number of French Dassault Mirage F1 and F2000s relocated there from Dushanbe Airport, Tajikistan.

==== The surge – Reception, Staging, Onward Movement, and Integration (RSOI) ====
The 143rd Expeditionary Sustainment Command (ESC) deployed to Kandahar Airfield in February 2009 and was the first ESC deployed to Afghanistan assuming responsibility as the Joint Sustainment Command-Afghanistan (JSC-A). Prior to their arrival, Sustainment Brigades managed the logistical operations however with the impending surge in U.S. Forces, the ESC was chosen for the Reception, Staging, Onward Movement, and Integration (RSOI) mission, as well as, coordinating sustainment distribution with joint, strategic and coalition stakeholders.

==== 2009 surge and onwards ====
The 2009 surge in NATO operations in southern Afghanistan pushed the number of aircraft operations at the base from 1,700 to 5,000 flights a week. The numbers meant that Kandahar had become the busiest one-runway airport in the world.

According to OSGEOINT (Open Source Imagery & Geospacial Intelligence), imagery analysis shows 2 deployments of unmanned aerial vehicles on the northeast section of the airfield. These two deployments were current as of 2012 and consisted of four MQ-1 Predators and four MQ-9 Reapers with the associated support equipment.

As of January 2012, Kandahar Airfield has a population of roughly 26,000 personnel. The United States Army Corps of Engineers began expansion work with the addition of new facilities for the Afghan Air Force.

Since 2011, modified Beechcraft King Airs have been used by the US Army for surveillance and reconnaissance within Afghanistan.

In 2019 the airport was officially changed to Ahmad Shah Baba International Airport, in honor of Ahmad Shah Durrani.

==== Drawdown ====
Between 2008 and September 2014 the Belgian Air Component operated F-16s from here.

Between May 2010 and September 2014 the USAF operated Beechcraft MC-12W Liberty aircraft from here for intelligence, surveillance and reconnaissance (ISR) missions.

A Canadian Armed Forces military memorial for members of the Canadian Armed Forces and civilians who died in Afghanistan was built in the airport. It was moved and relocated to Canada in 2011.

In May 2021, the Resolute Support Mission departed the base and handed it over to members of the Afghan National Security Forces. And on 16 August of the same year they handed it over to forces of the Islamic Emirate of Afghanistan.

== Airlines and destinations ==
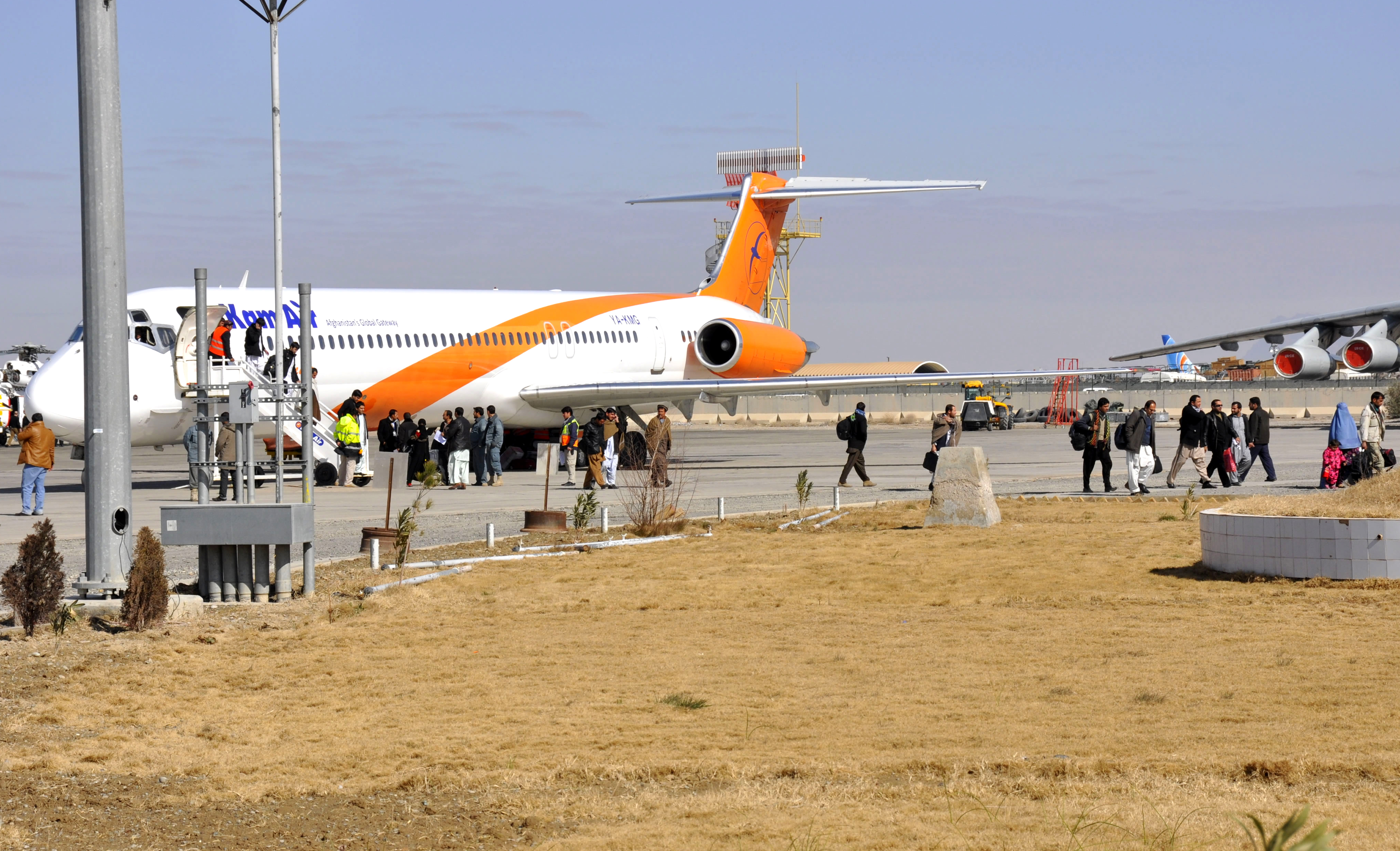
A Kam Air passenger plane at Kandahar International Airport in 2012

=== Passenger ===
As of 2023, the following airlines provide travel services at Kandahar International Airport:

Airlines	Destinations
Kam Air	Kabul

== Accidents and incidents ==
- In December 1999, one person was killed and 17 wounded during the hijacking of Indian Airlines Flight 814. The plane stayed at Kandahar for a few more days before flying out.
- On 8 December 2015, at least 61 people were killed and at least 35 wounded during the 2015 Kandahar Airport bombing.
- On 17 December 2016, a shooting at the airport resulted in the deaths of at least six people.
- On 27 January 2020, an E-11A crashed en route to or from its temporary base at Kandahar.
- On 1 August 2021, the airport was hit by three rockets that were fired by the Taliban. Flights were halted but no one was reported injured.The airport's runway suffered damage that was quickly repaired, according to the airport's chief Massoud Pashtun.

== See also ==
- List of airports in Afghanistan
