= Brian Beaudreault =

United States Marine Corps general

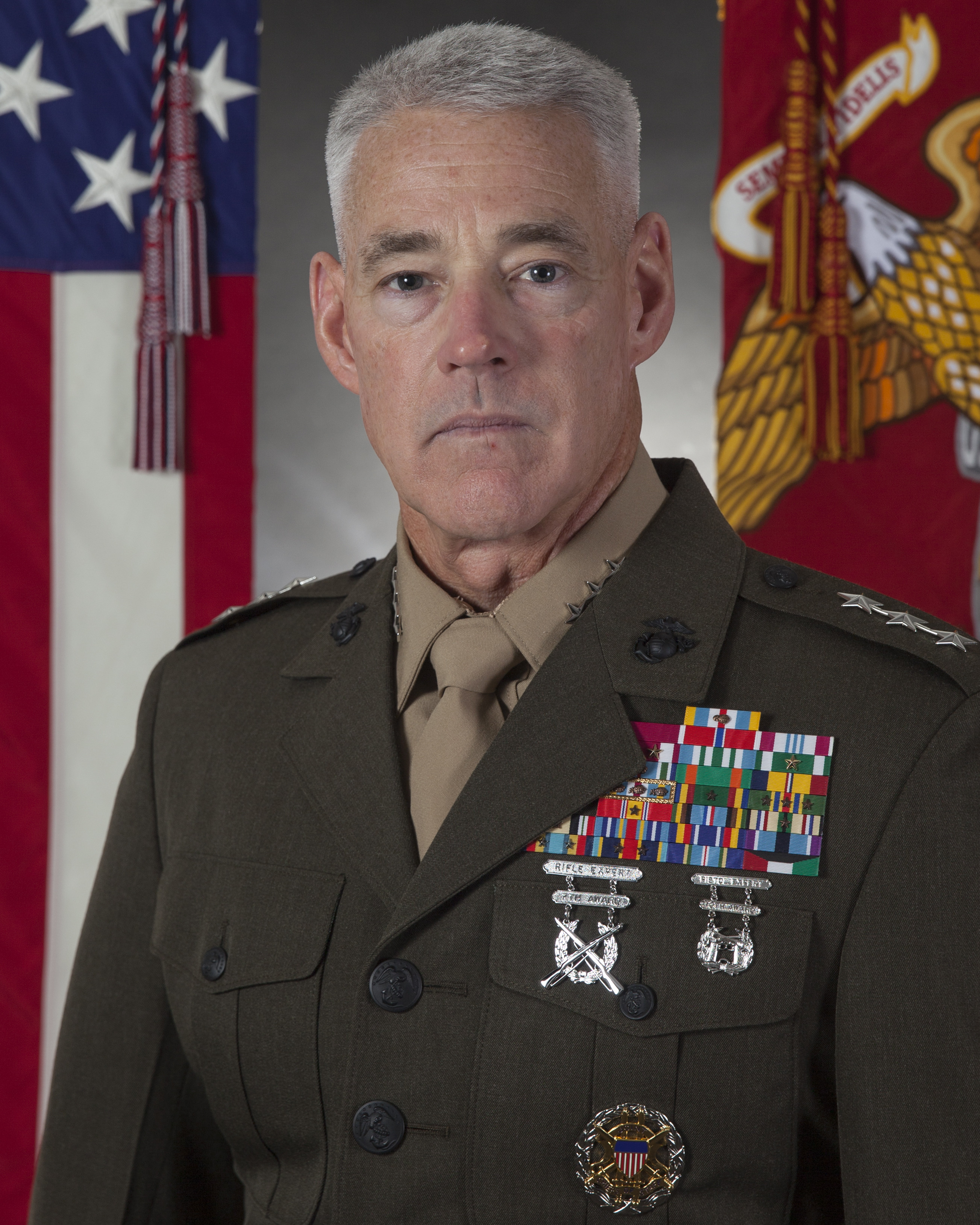
- Born: 1960 (age 65–66)
- Military career
- Allegiance: United States
- Branch: United States Marine Corps
- Service years: 1983–2021
- Rank: Lieutenant General
- Commands: II Marine Expeditionary Force; 2nd Marine Division; 15th Marine Expeditionary Unit; 1st Battalion, 1st Marines
- Conflicts: Gulf War; Iraq War
- Awards: Distinguished Service Medal; Defense Superior Service Medal (2); Legion of Merit; Bronze Star Medal

Brian D. Beaudreault (born 1960) is a retired United States Marine Corps lieutenant general who most recently served as commander of II Marine Expeditionary Force. He previously served as the Deputy Commandant for Plans, Policies, and Operations and Commanding General, 2nd Marine Division.

== Marine Corps career ==
Beaudreault was commissioned as a second lieutenant in 1983, after graduating from the University of Massachusetts, Amherst. He graduated from The Basic School and was assigned to 1st Battalion, 3rd Marines as rifle platoon commander and company executive officer. His next assignment was 2nd Battalion, 9th Marines where he served as Assistant Operations Officer, Logistics Officer, Maritime Special Purpose Force Commander and Company Commander. He deployed with 15th Marine Expeditionary Unit during Operation Restore Hope in Somalia. He served a brief tour as Guard Officer, Marine Corps Security Force Company, Naval Station Roosevelt Roads. As a field grade officer, Beaudreault graduated from the Amphibious Warfare School and later served as Operations Officer with 31st Marine Expeditionary Unit. After promotion to lieutenant colonel, Beaudreault received assignment as Commanding Officer of 1st Battalion, 1st Marines, 13th Marine Expeditionary Unit and deployed to Iraq during Operation Iraqi Freedom. As a colonel, Beaudreault was assigned as Commanding Officer, 15th Marine Expeditionary Unit and deployed a second time during Operation Iraqi Freedom.

Beaudreault's staff and joint duty assignments include Inspector-Instructor, 3rd Battalion, 23rd Marines; student, United States Army Command and General Staff College; Executive Officer, 1st Marine Regiment; student, Naval War College; Ground Plans Officer, Operations Directorate, United States Central Command; student, Higher Command and Staff Course, Defence Academy of the United Kingdom; Deputy Director, Future Joint Force Development, Joint Staff (J7); Director, Expeditionary Warfare School. As a general officer Beaudreault served as Commanding General, 2nd Marine Division from August 2014 to June 2016; Director of Operations and Cyber (J3), United States Africa Command; Deputy Commander, Marine Forces Central Command and Commander MARCENT (Forward); and Commanding General, II Marine Expeditionary Force from July 13, 2019 to July 8, 2021.

He retired after relinquishing command of II MEF to William Jurney on July 8, 2021 after 38 years of service, participating in a retirement ceremony presided by Assistant Commandant of the Marine Corps Gary L. Thomas.

Military offices
Preceded by ???	Director of Operations and Cyber of the United States Africa Command; 201?–2014	Succeeded by Bryan G. Watson
Preceded by James W. Lukeman	Commanding General of the 2nd Marine Division; 2014–2016	Succeeded by John K. Love
Preceded by Ronald L. Bailey	Deputy Commandant for Plans, Policies, and Operations of the United States Marine Corps; 2017–2019	Succeeded by George W. Smith Jr.
Preceded by Robert F. Hedelund	Commander of the II Marine Expeditionary Force; 2019–2021	Succeeded by William M. Jurney
