= Bob Judson =

Air Vice-Marshal Bob Judson FRAeS FCMI
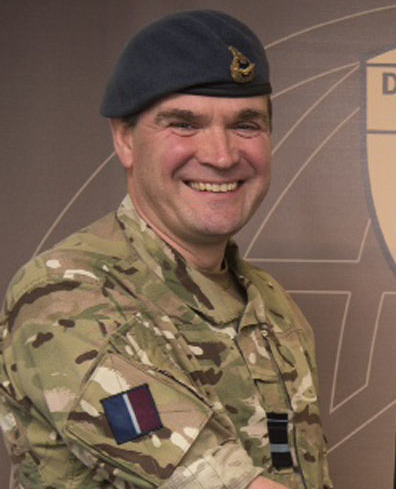
- Air Vice-Marshal Judson in 2014
- Military career
- Allegiance: United Kingdom
- Branch: Royal Air Force
- Service years: 1980–2015
- Rank: Air Vice-Marshal
- Commands: Kandahar Airfield (2008); RAF Coningsby (2004–06)
- Conflicts: War in Afghanistan

Air Vice-Marshal Robert William Judson is a retired senior Royal Air Force officer. He was the first Station Commander of RAF Coningsby in the Eurofighter Typhoon-era.

== RAF career ==
Judson has been involved in many milestone events, personally piloting the 100th Typhoon off the production line to RAF Coningsby from the BAE Systems' Warton factory (Lancs), and acting as overall formation leader for HM The Queen's 80th birthday flypast of nearly 50 aircraft, considered the largest flypast the Royal Air Force has produced in decades.

Promoted to air commodore on 1 July 2007, Judson served as commander of Kandahar Airfield in Afghanistan in 2008, and stars in the Channel Five documentary Warzone, which looks into the life and operations of personnel stationed at the airfield.

Judson was appointed Director Targeting and Information Operations in the Ministry of Defence in November 2008.

== Corporate career ==
Since 2015, Judson is a Director in the Resilience and Crisis Management Team, part of Deloitte UK's Risk Advisory service line.

Military offices
Unknown	Station Commander RAF Coningsby; 2004–2006	Succeeded by Stuart Atha
Preceded by Ashley Stevenson	Commander Kandahar Airfield, Afghanistan; 2008	Succeeded by A D Fryer
Preceded by G A Wright	Director Targeting and Information Operations; 2008–2010	Unknown
