= RAF Wittering =

Royal Air Force air combat support station in Cambridgeshire, England

RAF Wittering
- Near Wittering, Cambridgeshire in England
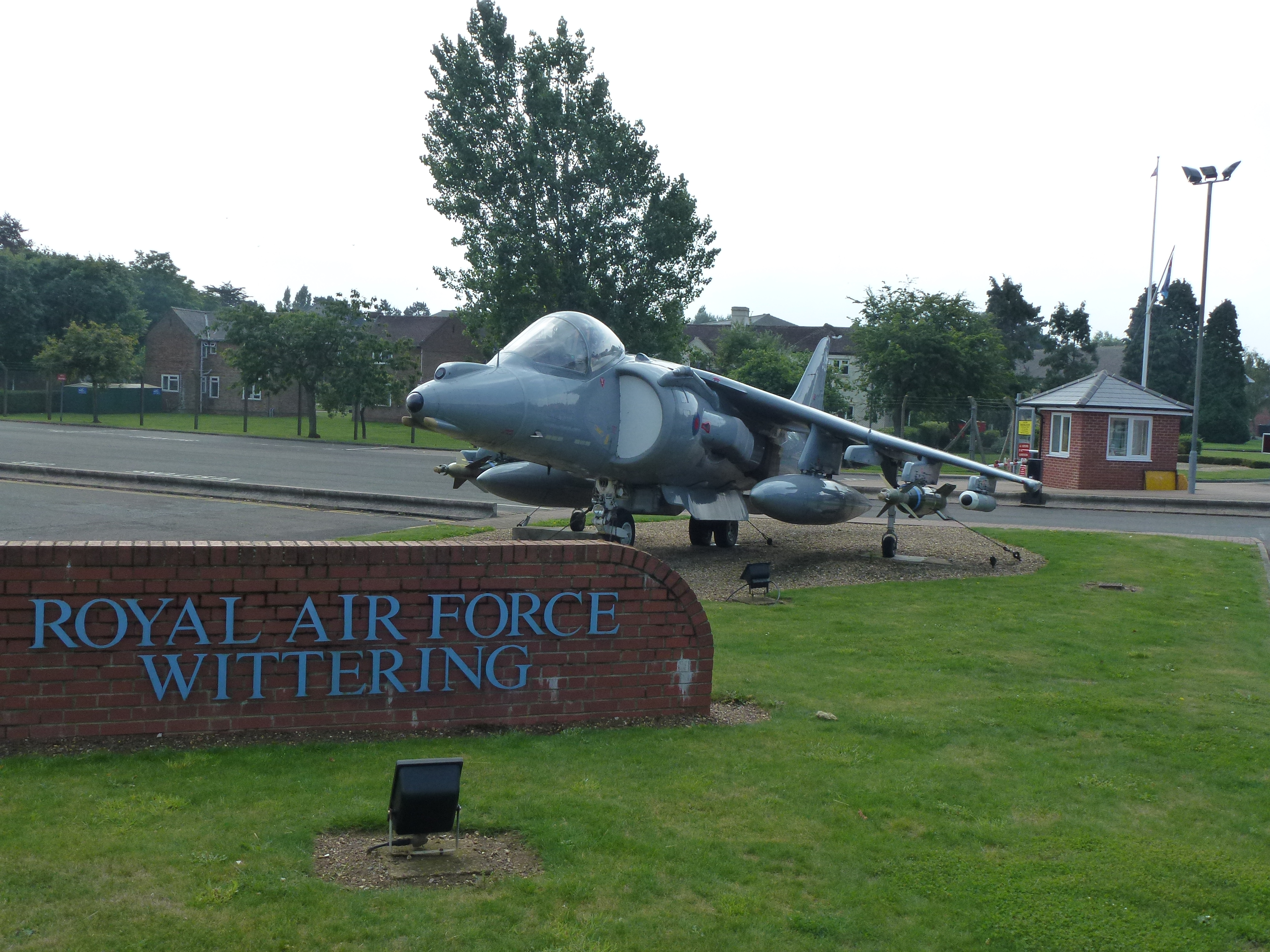
- The main entrance and BAe Harrier GR7A gate guardian

- Strength is Freedom

Site information
- Type: Air combat support station
- Owner: Ministry of Defence
- Operator: Royal Air Force
- Controlled by: No. 2 Group (Air Combat Support)
- Condition: Operational
- Website: www.raf.mod.uk/our-organisation/stations/raf-wittering/

Location
- Shown within Cambridgeshire
- Coordinates: 52°36′45″N 000°28′35″W
- Grid reference: TF045025
- Area: 449 hectares

Site history
- Built: 5 May 1916
- In use: 1916 – present

Garrison information
- Current commander: Wing Commander Joan Ochuodho
- Occupants: Headquarters and elements of No. 42 (Expeditionary Support) Wing; Headquarters and elements of No. 85 (Expeditionary Logistics) Wing; Headquarters 12 (Force Support) Engineer Group; Headquarters and elements of 20 Works Group Royal Engineers; No. 16 Squadron; No. 115 Squadron; South & East Midlands Wing, RAF Air Cadets; University of London Air Squadron; Cambridge University Air Squadron; No. 5 Air Experience Flight

Airfield information
- Identifiers: ICAO: EGXT, WMO: 03462
- Elevation: 273 feet (83 m) AMSL
Runways
Direction	Length and surface
07/25	2,759 metres (9,052 ft) Asphalt
- Source: RAF Wittering Defence Aerodrome Manual

Royal Air Force Wittering or more simply RAF Wittering (ICAO: EGXT) is a Royal Air Force station 10 miles (16 km) northwest of Peterborough, just south of Stamford, and just west of the A1 Great North Road. It lies within the unitary authority area of Peterborough, Cambridgeshire and the unitary authority area of North Northamptonshire. Although Stamford in Lincolnshire is the nearest town, the runways of RAF Wittering cross the boundary between Cambridgeshire and Northamptonshire.

== History ==
=== First World War ===
Wittering's use as a military airfield dates back to 5 May 1916 when it began as RFC Stamford. The aerodrome was initially created for A Flight of No. 38 (Home Defence) Squadron. In common with other Home Defence squadrons at the time it was used for training during the day and for air defence at night. From the flight's operational declaration in December 1916 until it deployed to France in November 1917, its BE2cs, RE7s, and FE2bs were involved in anti-Zeppelin patrols.

The station's training role expanded when it became the Royal Flying Corps's No.1 Training Depot Station in 1917. The neighbouring airfield, RFC Easton on the Hill, also dates back to 1916 and it became No. 5 Training Depot Station in 1917. Following the formation of the Royal Air Force, Easton on the Hill became RAF Collyweston on 1 April 1918. Stamford was retitled RAF Wittering on 10 April 1918.

=== Interwar period ===
==== Flying training ====
RAF Wittering officially reopened in 1924 following an Air Defence Review in 1923. A significant amount of development took place to re-open the station including four new accommodation blocks for airmen, a corporals and airmen's institute, a Senior Non-Commissioned Officers' Mess, the Officers' Mess, (Note: 'The Station's Officers' Mess is one few that predates College Hall Officers' Mess at Cranwell) and a new guardroom. The station retained two aircraft hangars from 1917 and an aircraft repair shed. The Central Flying School was at Wittering from 1926 until 1935 being replaced by No. 11 Flying Training School until 1938.

==== Preparation for war – Fighter Command ====
In April 1938, the station became a Fighter Command station within No 12 Group. This conversion required another expansion with more land being purchased to the south and east of the station which closed the Stamford to Oundle road. (Note: 'The road from the southern boundary of the Station to the A47 road is called the 'Old Oundle Road') Further airmen's accommodation, airmen's mess, technical accommodation and station headquarters were constructed as was a sector control room to control fighter squadrons and anti-aircraft gun batteries within 12 Group's 'K' Sector. The airfield was enhanced with the construction of three new Type C (1934 variant) hangars.

=== Second World War ===
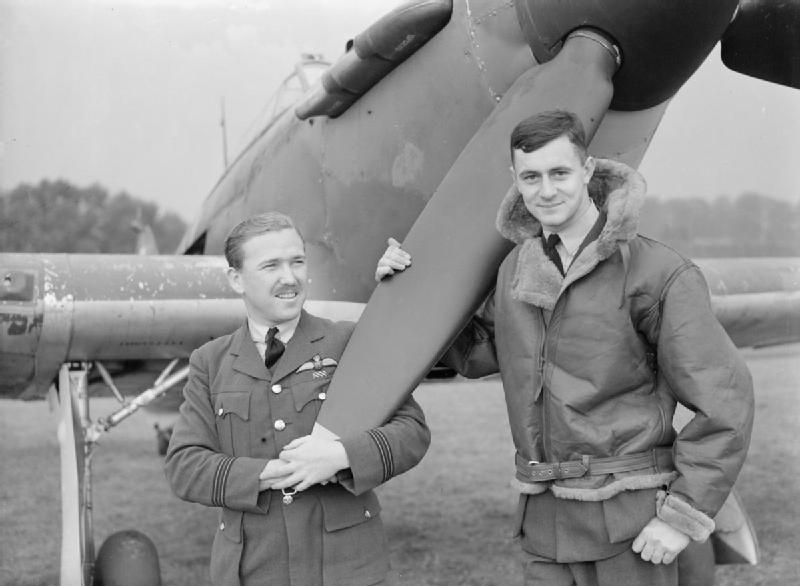
Flight Lieutenant M H Brown and Pilot Officer Chatham of No. 1 Squadron standing by the nose of a Hawker Hurricane Mark I at Wittering,. CH1566

In 1940–41 during the Second World War, units from the station was directly involved in both the Battle of Britain and the Blitz. As part of No. 12 Group (controlled from RAF Watnall in Nottinghamshire), Wittering was the main fighter station for the southern East Midlands, and aircraft from the station would often patrol as far as Birmingham. During the Battle of Britain many squadrons were rotated through Wittering to spells in the south of England with No. 11 Group that was bearing the brunt of the battle. With many of the Luftwaffe raids during the Blitz taking part at night, Wittering-based squadrons were instrumental in the development of night combat techniques. These included the use of the Turbinlite aircraft which had a powerful searchlight installed in the nose of Douglas A-20 Havocs. In April 1943 No. 141 Squadron moved in, operating de Havilland Mosquitos. 1943 also saw the station host two USAAF squadrons, albeit temporarily: 63d Fighter Squadron USAAF with P-47s operated from Wittering between January and March before moving to RAF Horsham St Faith; and from August to March 1944 55th Fighter Squadron operated P-38s and P-51s from Wittering before moving to nearby RAF Kingscliffe.

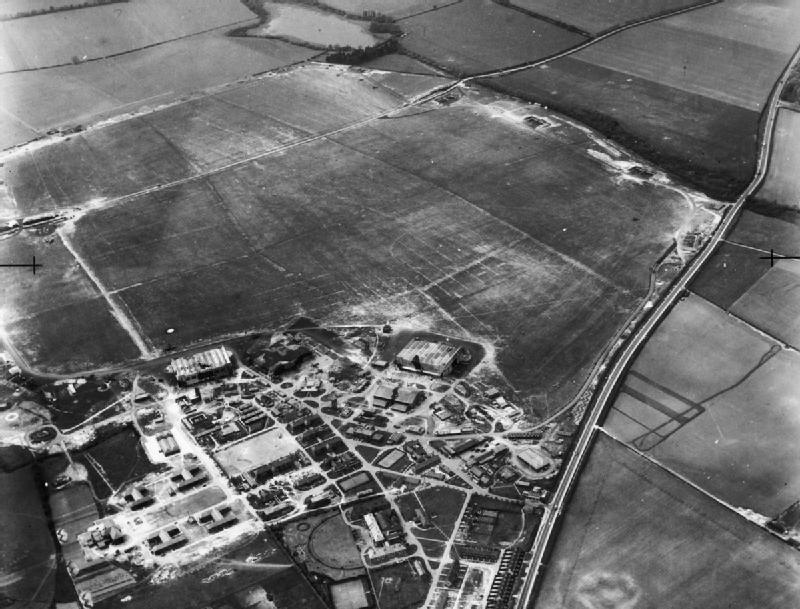
RAF Wittering after the attack on 14 March 1941. Bomb damage can be seen to the roof of the left-most hangar. The runway linking RAF Wittering to Collyweston Landing Ground had not yet been constructed. WWII IWM HU 91901

Emergency landing ground K3 was renamed as Collyweston Landing Ground in 1940 with the construction of some blister hangars, a perimeter track and some dispersals, although the next main fighter station further north was RAF Coleby Grange. Embry in Mission Completed states that in 1940 (the station's official history indicates that this was actually in 1941), while used by 25 Squadron, equipped with Beaufighter night fighters, the runway was extended from 1,400 yards to 3 miles long to reduce landing accidents at night and in bad weather.

The station's innovative role continued and developed throughout the war. It became the home of both fighter and gunnery research and development units working with new equipment and techniques. In addition, No. 1426 (Captured Enemy Aircraft) Flight (colloquially known as the RAFwaffe) was based at Collyweston Landing Ground with its wide range of captured Luftwaffe aircraft both evaluating their performance and touring allied bases. In January 1945, the captured enemy aircraft were removed.

During the war, the airfield was bombed five times, with seventeen people being killed on 14 March 1941. Aircraft from the station downed 151 Luftwaffe aeroplanes and 89 V-1 flying bombs. Hugh Jenkins, Baron Jenkins of Putney served at the station, as did Andrew Humphrey (later Chief of the Defence Staff from 1976 to 1977, who flew Supermarine Spitfires with 266 Squadron).

=== Post-war use ===
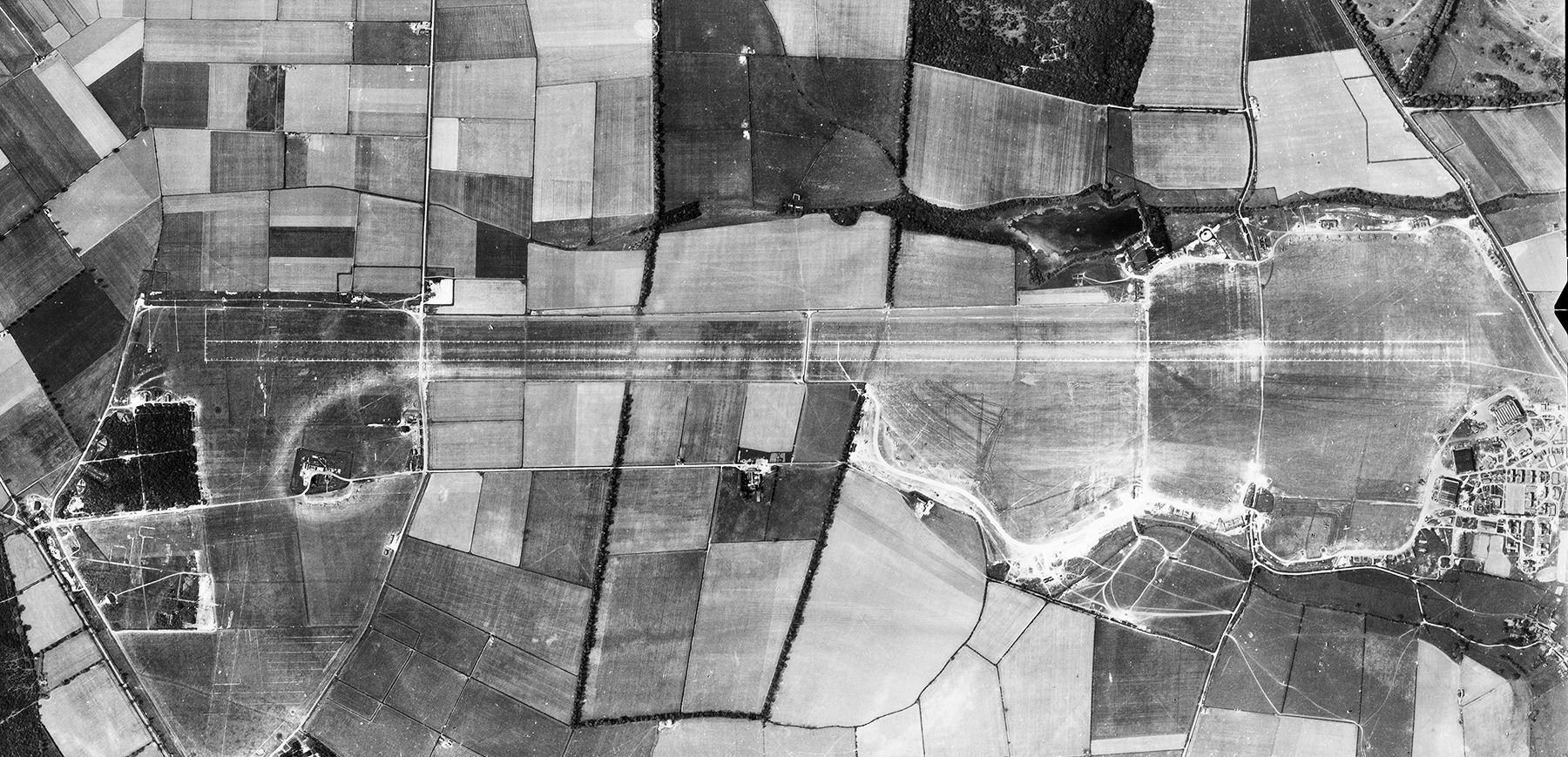
Aerial photograph of Wittering airfield, 9 May 1944

==== Bomber Command ====
Immediately after the war RAF Wittering, once again, transferred back to Fighter Command in 1946 providing a home to a variety of squadrons operating Spitfires, Mosquitos and Hornets. In 1948, the Station transferred back to Training Command for 2 years before Maintenance Command took responsibility to undertake some significant redevelopment between 1950 and 1952 as the Cold War saw RAF Wittering become a vital part of the United Kingdom's strategic nuclear deterrent under the control of Bomber Command in 1953.

The current airfield was created by the merging of RAF Wittering and nearby Collyweston Relief Landing Ground, by the construction of a 1.7-mile runway between them in 1941. Conversion to a Bomber airfield saw the construction of a new concrete runway (slightly to the south of the 1941 runway), taxiways and dispersals (with further H-dispersals and QRA dispersals being added later) that still form the majority of the Station's aircraft operating surfaces. A wide-span Gaydon hangar for the Canberra B2 bombers was constructed along with a new control tower, avionics building and nuclear storage and maintenance facilities.

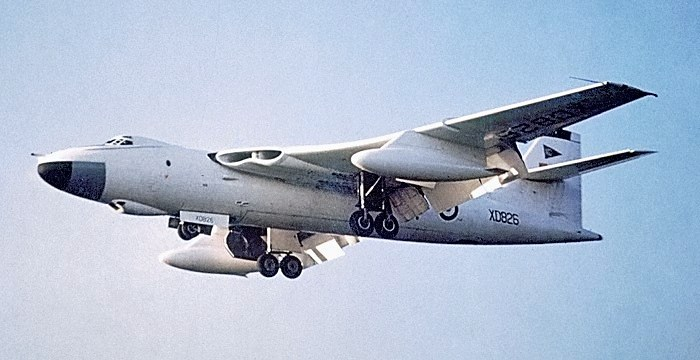
RAF Vickers Valiant, in all-white anti-flash scheme

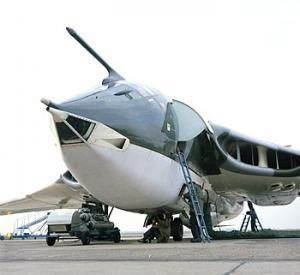
RAF Victor B.2

In its new guise as a bomber station, RAF Wittering initially operated Avro Lincolns from 1953 although these were replaced by English Electric Canberras later that year. The first British operational atomic bomb, the Blue Danube, was deployed to RAF Wittering in November 1953. The first V-bombers (the Vickers Valiant, the Handley Page Victor and the Avro Vulcan) were delivered in July 1955. In 1956–58 Valiant bombers of 49 Squadron based at Wittering participated in the Operation Buffalo and Operation Grapple nuclear tests, during which they conducted all eight air drops ever carried out with British nuclear weapons. Four Valiant bombers were assigned to the programme and flew from Wittering to the designated test locations in Australia and the Pacific, respectively.

Until January 1969 two squadrons (100 and 139) of Victor B.2 bombers equipped with Blue Steel stand-off missiles were part of the QRA (Quick Reaction Alert) force of the RAF. Two nuclear armed aircraft were permanently on 15 minutes readiness to take off. They were parked within 100 m (110 yd) of the westerly runway threshold. In times of higher tension, four bombers could be stationed beside the runway on the ORP (Operational Readiness Platform). If the aircraft were crewed they could all be airborne within 30 seconds, a feat often demonstrated at V force stations across the country. Since the incoming missile warning from the RAF Fylingdales BMEWS array was only four minutes before impact this ensured if the country came under attack, the bombers would be scrambled and able to retaliate.

In 1968, the base became part of Strike Command. From October 1972 until August 1976, there were two squadrons flying the Hawker Hunter No. 45 Squadron initially and then 58 Squadron as well.

==== Harriers ====
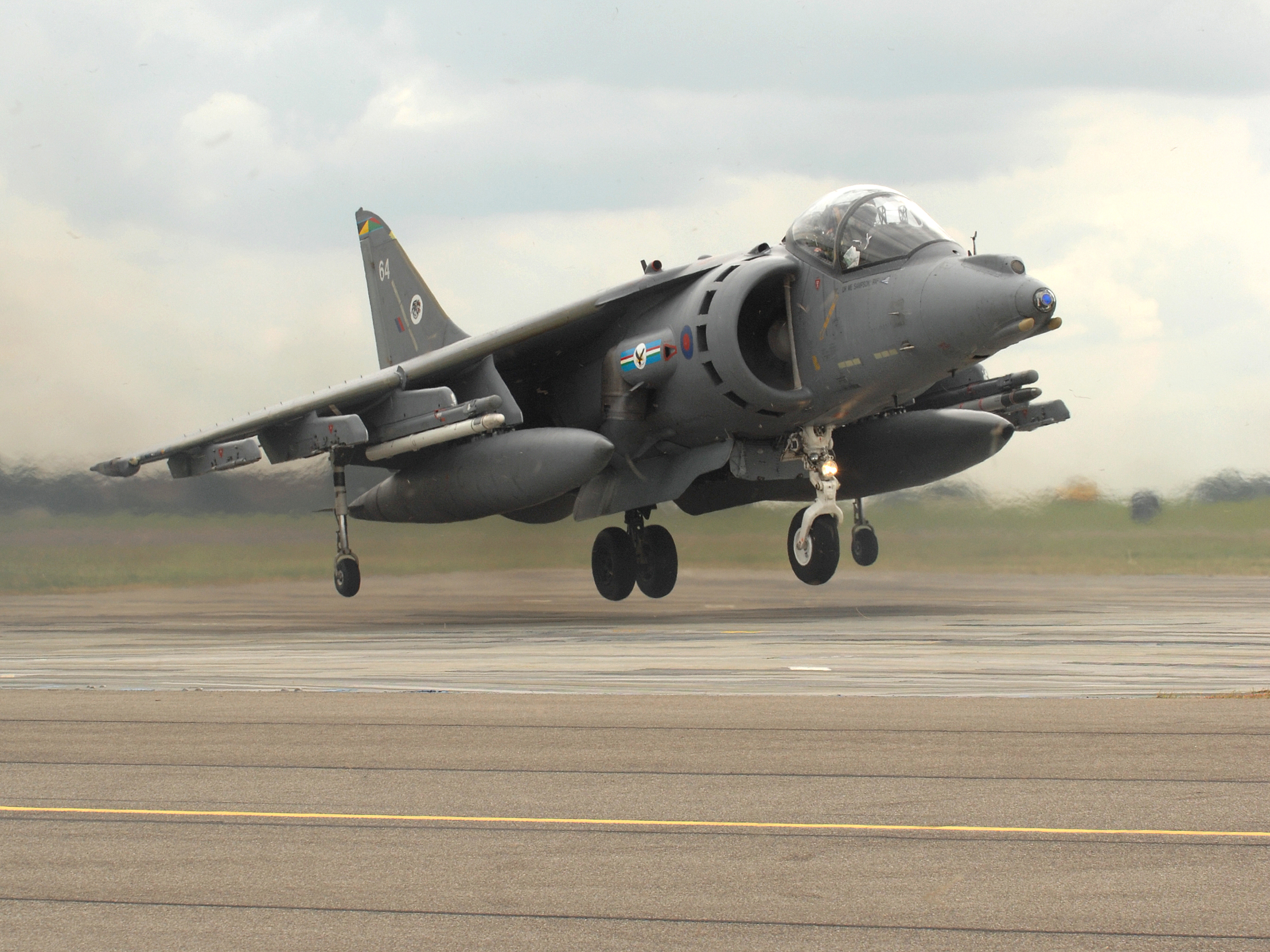
A Harrier is seen landing, at RAF Wittering, on a Forward Operating or MEXE Pad. The pad measures 100ft X 100ft and is made from prefabricated surface aluminium interlocking (PSAI) matting. The pads were used by novice pilots and veterans alike to practice the accuracy of their vertical landings.

From 1968 the station was known as the Home of the Harrier: the first Harriers arrived for No. 1(Fighter) Squadron in August 1969.

In May 1971, four aircraft from 1(F) Sqn operated from HMS Ark Royal, the first time the Harrier had operated from an aircraft carrier, under Wing Commander (later Sir) Kenneth Hayr, later killed at the Biggin Hill airshow on 2 June 2001.

In 1982, six Harrier GR3 aircraft were taken down to the Falklands on SS Atlantic Conveyor, and survived the Exocet attack, later to board HMS Hermes in May 1982. In June 1982, 12 GR3 aircraft were flown from Wittering, via RAF Ascension Island and mid-air refuelling with Victor tankers, on an 8,000-mile journey to the Falklands in 17 hours, which set an RAF record. The Harriers were from 1(F) Sqn. On 27 May 1982, Sqn Ldr (later Gp Capt) Bob Iveson was hit by anti-aircraft fire from GADA 601's 35mm cannon, and he ejected seconds before his aircraft exploded in mid-air near Goose Green. He evaded capture for two and a half days before being rescued by helicopter.

The Queen visited the station in June 1982 as part of the RAF Regiment's 40th anniversary celebrations.

During January 1992, a new station museum opened in the original station church, which was built in 1944.

It was announced in December 2009 that RAF Wittering was to become the sole operational base for the Harriers of Joint Force Harrier after the announcement that RAF Cottesmore was to close. However, as a result of the 2010 Strategic Defence and Security Review, the Harrier fleet was withdrawn in December 2010.

In March 2019, the Ministry of Defence indicated that RAF Wittering, alongside RAF Waddington and RAF Leeming, was being considered as the future home of the RAF Aerobatic Team the Red Arrows. In May 2020 however it was confirmed that the team would move to Waddington.

== Role and operations ==
In 2016 the Ministry of Defence confirmed that the Station would be one of the RAF's 'well found centres of specialisation for' 'Support Enablers' along with RAF Leeming.

=== Command ===
The station is part of No 2 Group. The station commander of RAF Wittering is currently Wing Commander Jeremy Case who assumed command from Group Captain Jo Lincoln on 10 June 2021. The station's honorary air commodore is Her Royal Highness the Duchess of Edinburgh.

=== Royal Air Force Engineering and Logistics Support Enablers ===
The station is the home of the RAF Support Force (the Royal Air Force's engineering and logistic Air Combat Service Support Units (ACSSUs)).

=== Flying training ===
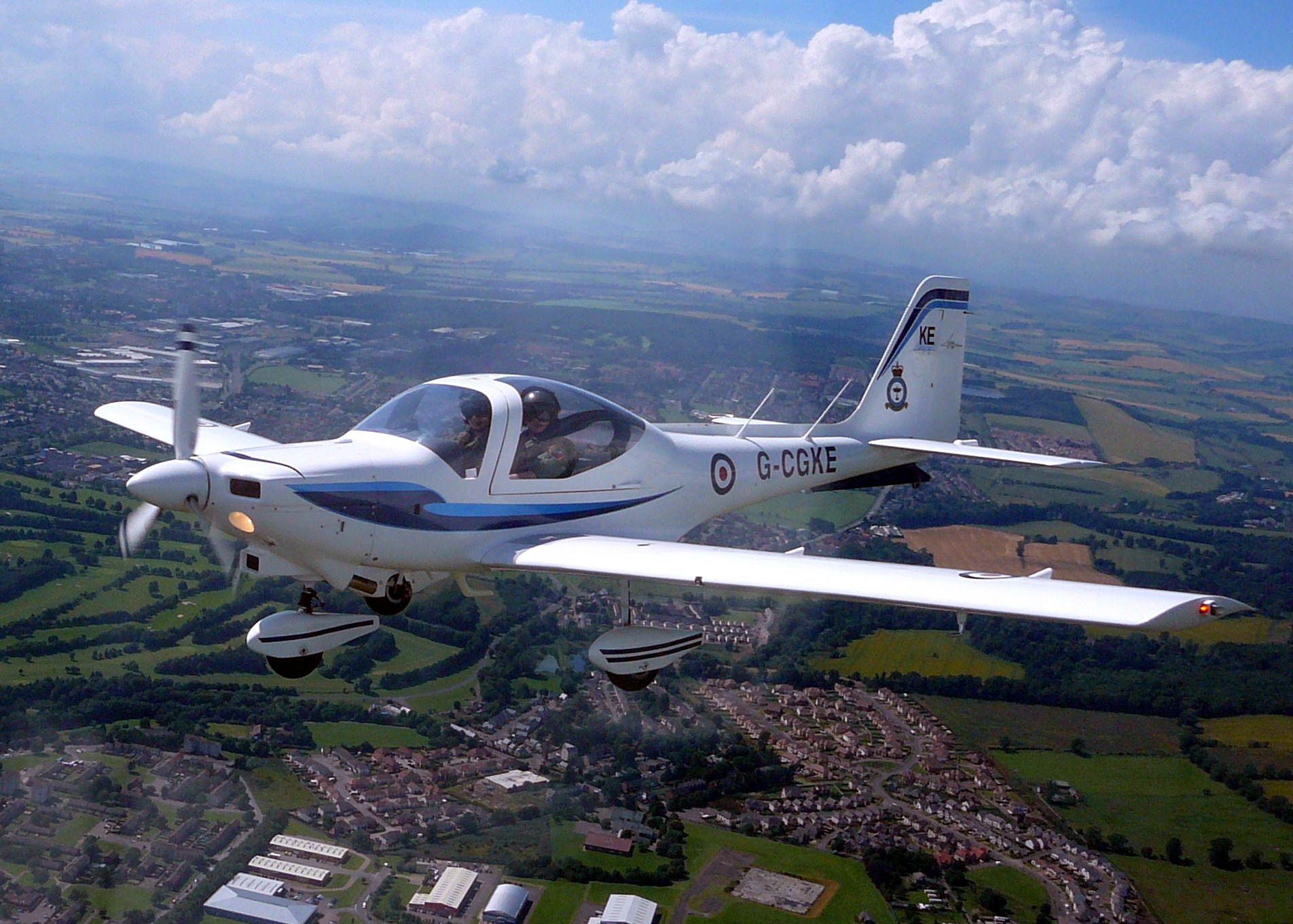
RAF Wittering hosts a number of units operating the Grob Tutor T1 training aircraft.

Previously the home of No 1 Training Depot Station (at Stamford aerodrome) and No 5 Training Depot Station (at Easton on the Hill aerodrome) of the Royal Flying Corps during the First World War and then the Royal Air Force's Central Flying School and No. 11 Flying Training School between the World Wars. RAF Wittering's return to flying training was marked on 4 February 2015 with the arrival of Cambridge University Air Squadron and the University of London Air Squadron. RAF Wittering is also the birthplace of the Royal Air Force Gliding & Soaring Association's Four Counties Gliding Club.

=== Royal Engineers ===
In November 2011 the Ministry of Defence announced that 44 Service personnel from HQ 12 (Air Support) Engineer Group, part of the Royal Engineers, would move from Waterbeach Barracks to RAF Wittering in 2012–13.

== Based units ==
Flying and notable non-flying units based at RAF Wittering.

=== Royal Air Force ===
No. 2 Group (Air Combat Support) RAF

- Support Force
  - Headquarters Support Force
  - No. 42 (Expeditionary Support) Wing
    - Headquarters No. 42 (Expeditionary Support) Wing
    - No. 71 (Inspection and Repair) Squadron
    - No. 93 (Expeditionary Armament) Squadron
    - No. 5001 Squadron
  - No. 85 Expeditionary Logistics Wing
    - Headquarters No. 85 Expeditionary Logistics Wing
    - No. 1 Expeditionary Logistics Squadron
    - No. 2 Mechanical Transport Squadron
    - No. 3 Mobile Catering Squadron
    - No. 504 (County of Nottingham) Squadron Royal Auxiliary Air Force

No. 22 Group (Training) RAF

- No. 3 Flying Training School
  - No. 16 Squadron – Grob Tutor T1
- No. 6 Flying Training School
  - No. 5 Air Experience Flight – Grob Tutor T1
  - No. 115 Squadron – Grob Tutor T1
  - Cambridge University Air Squadron – Grob Tutor T1
  - University of London Air Squadron – Grob Tutor T1
- Air Training Corps
  - Headquarters South & East Midlands Wing

=== British Army ===
Royal Engineers

- 8 Engineer Brigade
  - 12 (Force Support) Engineer Group
    - Headquarters 12 (Force Support) Engineer Group
    - 20 Works Group (Air Support)
      - Headquarters 20 Works Group (Air Support)
      - 529 Specialist Team Royal Engineers (Air Support) (STRE)
      - 532 Specialist Team Royal Engineers (Air Support) (STRE)

== Units ==
Dates	Unit	Aircraft	Comments
1916–17	'A' Flight No 38 (Home Defence) Squadron	BE2c; RE7; FE2b	Stamford
1917–19	No 1 Training Depot Station	Bristol F2b; Avro 4504K	Stamford/Wittering
1917–19	United States Detachment Elementary Flying School and 831st Aeroplane Repair Squadron	DH6; Curtiss JN	Stamford/Wittering
1917–19	No 5 Training Depot Station	Snipe, Camel, Scout, RE8, DH9, DH9a	Easton on the Hill/ Collyweston
1917–19	United States Aeroplane Repair Squadron		Easton on the Hill/ Collyweston
1919–24			Care and Maintenance
1924–35	Central Flying School	Avro 504K; Bristol Fighter; Snipe; Grebe; Gamecock; Siskin; Lynx; Hawker Tomfit; Hawker Hart; Bristol Bulldog; Fairy IIIF; Armstrong Whitworth Atlas; Vickers Victoria	
1935–38	No 11 Flying Training School	Tutor; Hart; Audux; Gauntlet; Fury	
1938–40	No 23 Squadron	Demon; Blenheim NF1	
1938–40	No 213 Squadron	Gauntlet II; Hurricane I	
1938–40	No 610 Squadron	Spitfire I	
1940	No 1 Squadron	Hurricane I	
1940	No 32 Squadron	Hurricane I	
1940	No 229 Squadron	Hurricane I	
1940	No 74 Squadron	Spitfire XII	
1940–42	No 25 Squadron	Beaufighter 1F	
1940–43	No 151 Squadron	Hurricane Iic; Defiant I & II; Mosquito NFII	
1940–42	No 266 Squadron	Spitfire I, IIa, IIb, & Vb	
1941–42	No 1453 Flight	Havoc (Turbinlite); Boston	
1942–43	No 532 Squadron	Havoc I (Turbinlite); Boston III; Hurricane IIb & IIc	From No 1453 Flight
1942–43	No 1529 Beam Approach Training (BAT) Flight	Magister	
1942–43	No 485 Squadron	Spitfire Vb	New Zealand
1942–43	No 486 Squadron	Hurricane IIb	New Zealand
1942–43	No 616 Squadron	Spitfire IIb & Vb	
1942–43	No 1530 BAT Flight	Airspeed Oxford	
1943	No 141 Squadron	Beaufighter VIF; Mosquito II	
1943	63d Fighter Squadron USAAF	P47 Thunderbolt	
1943–44	55th Fighter Squadron USAAF	P38 Lightning; P51 Mustang	Walcot Hall
1943	No 118 Squadron	Spitfire Vb	
1943–45	No 1426 (Captured Enemy Aircraft) Flight	Various German aircraft	
1943–44	Air Fighting Development Unit Naval Air Fighting Development Unit	Various	
1943	No 91 Squadron	Spitfire XII	
1943–44	No 438 Squadron RCAF	Hurricane IV	From No 118 Squadron
1944	Gunnery Research Unit	Various	
1944	No 658 Squadron	Auster AOP III & IV	
1944	Fighter Interception Unit Night Fighter Interception Unit	Mosquito; Typhoon; Beaufighter	
1944–45	Central Fighter Establishment	Various	
1945	No 68 Squadron	Mosquito XVII, XIX & XXX	
1945	Nos 109 & 110 Personnel Reception Centres		
1946	No 219 Squadron	Mosquito NF30	
1946–47	No 19 Squadron	Spitfire F21; Hornet I	
1946–47	No 23 Squadron	Mosquito NF30	
1946–47	No 41 Squadron	Spitfire F21; Hornet	
1946–47	No 141 Squadron	Mosquito NF36	
1947–48	No 264 Squadron	Mosquito NF36	
1948–50	No 1 Initial Training School		
1948–50	No 23 Group School of Instructional Technique		
1950–52			Airfield Reconstruction
1952–53	Central Servicing Development Establishment		
1953–68	Bomber Command Armament School		
1953–54	No 49 Squadron	Lincoln B2	
1953–55	No 61 Squadron	Lincoln B2; Canberra B2	
1953–59	No 100 Squadron	Lincoln B2; Canberra B2, B6, PR7, & B(I)8	
1954–56	No 40 Squadron	Canberra B2	
1954–55	No 76 Squadron	Canberra B2	
1954–60	Bomber Command Development Unit	Canberra; Valiant B1	
1954–55	No 1321 Flight	Valiant B1	
1955–62	No 138 Squadron	Valiant B1, B(PR)1, & B(PR)K1	
1956–61	No 49 Squadron	Valiant B1, B(PR)1, & B(K)1	
1961–62	No 7 Squadron	Valiant B(K)1 & B(PR)K1	
1957–71	Bombing and Navigation Systems Development Squadron		
1962–68	No 100 Squadron	Victor B2	Blue Steel
1963–68	No 139 Squadron	Victor B2	Blue Steel
1968–71	Strike Command Armament School		
1969–71	No 230 Squadron	Whirlwind HC10	
1969–82	No 51 Squadron RAF Regiment		
1969–70	Harrier Conversion Unit	Harrier GR1, Hunter FGA9	
1969–2000	No 1 (Fighter) Squadron	Harrier GR1, GR3, GR5, & GR7	
1969–83	No 15 Squadron RAF Regiment		
1970–82	Headquarters No 5 Wing RAF Regiment		
1970–92	No 233 Operational Conversion Unit	Harrier GR1, T2, GR3, T4, & GR5	From Harrier Conversion Unit
1970	No IV (Army Cooperation) Squadron	Hunter FGA9, Harrier GR1	
1971–2000	RAF Armament Support Unit		
1972–76	No 45 Squadron	Hunter FGA9	
1973–76	No 58 (Reserve) Squadron	Hunter FGA9	
1992–2010	No 20 (Reserve) Squadron	Harrier GR7, GR9, & T10	From 233 Operational Conversion Unit
1995–2020	No 5131 (Bomb Disposal) Squadron		
1999–2004	No 1 Tactical Service to Operate Headquarters		
2001–06	No. 37 Squadron RAF Regiment		
2004–15	Headquarters No 1 RAF Force Protection Wing		From No 1 Tactical Survive to Operate Headquarters
2006–	Headquarters No 85 (Expeditionary Logistics) Wing		
2006–	No 5001 Squadron		Expeditionary Airfield Facilities
2006–	No 2 Mechanical Transport Squadron		
2006-7	Mobile Catering Support Unit		
2006	RAF Armament Support Unit		
2007–15	No 3 Squadron RAF Regiment		
2007–	Headquarters No 42 (Expeditionary Support) Wing		
2007–	No 1 Expeditionary Logistics Squadron		
2007–	No 3 Mobile Catering Squadron		From Mobile Catering Support Unit
2010–11	No IV (Reserve) Squadron	Harrier GR9 & T10	From No 20 (Reserve) Squadron
2012–	No 504 (County of Nottingham) Squadron Royal Auxiliary Air Force		
2012–	Headquarters 20 Works Group Royal Engineers		
2013–	Headquarters 12 Engineer Group		
2013–14	Headquarters Joint Force Support (Afghanistan) 16		
2015–	No 16 Squadron	Tutor T1	
2015–	No 115 Squadron	Tutor T1	
2015–	Cambridge University Air Squadron	Tutor T1	Includes No 5 Air Experience Flight
2015–	University of London Air Squadron	Tutor T1	

== Station commanders ==
The station commanders have been:

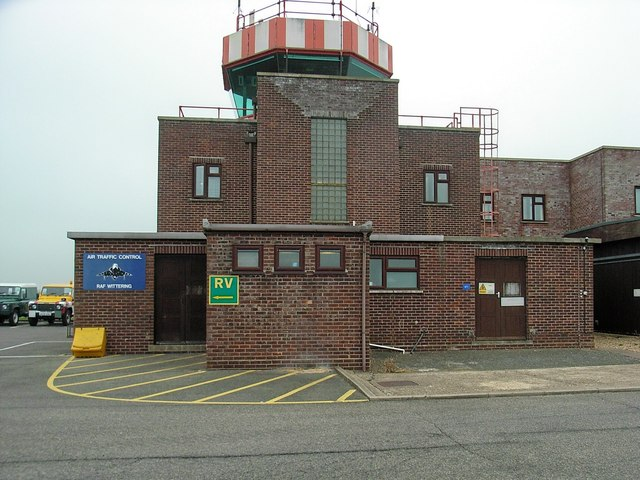
ATC tower

- Group Captain Dudley Radford 1948
- Group Captain John Woodroffe 1955-57
- Group Captain Sir Alan Boxer 1958-9
- Group Captain Leonard Trent 1959–62
- Group Captain John Lawrence 1962-4
- Group Captain Paul Mallorie 1964-9
- Group Captain Peter Williamson 1969–70
- Group Captain Alan Merriman 1970-2
- Group Captain IH Kepple 1972–
- Group Captain Laurence Jones 1975-6
- Group Captain David Brook 1976-8
- Group Captain AG Bridges 1978–1981
- Group Captain P King 1981–1983
- Group Captain Peter Dodworth March 1983– February 1985
- Group Captain Peter Millar February 1985– 1986
- Group Captain John Feesey 1986-8
- Group Captain John Thompson 1988–1990
- Group Captain Syd Morris 1990–1992
- Group Captain PW Day AFC 1992–1995
- Group Captain J Connolly 1995-7
- Group Captain Chris Moran 1997-9
- Group Captain David Haward 1998 (Note: Group Captain Haward was named as the new station commander at RAF Wittering in December 1998. A week later, on 18 December 1998, his Harrier aircraft crashed near to Barnard Castle in County Durham. Haward died at the scene.)
- Group Captain Andre Dezonie 1999–2001
- Group Captain A Kirkpatrick 2001-3
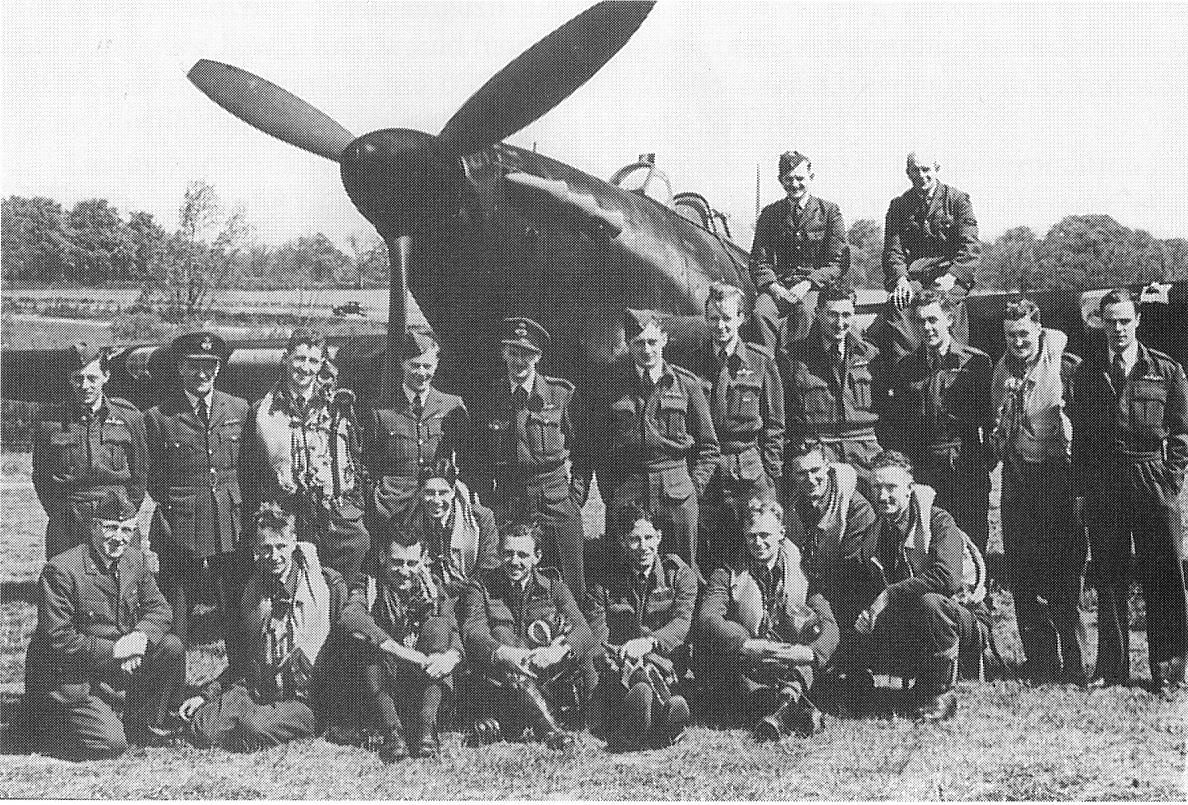
  486 Sqn (RNZAF) Hurricane in 1942
- Group Captain M Jenkins 2003-5
- Group Captain Ashley Stevenson 2005 – November 2006
- Group Captain Rowena Atherton November 2006 – June 2008
- Group Captain Paul Higgins June 2008 – December 2009
- Group Captain Richard Knighton December 2009 – June 2011
- Group Captain Richard Hill June 2011 – June 2013
- Group Captain Damian Alexander June 2013 – June 2015
- Group Captain Richard Pratley June 2015 – June 2017
- Group Captain Tony Keeling June 2017 – August 2019
- Group Captain Jo Lincoln August 2019 – June 2021
- Wing Commander Jeremy Case June 2021 – February 2023
- Wing Commander Nicola Duncan February 2023 – January 2026
- Wing Commander Joan Ochuodho January 2026 –

== Freedoms ==
RAF Wittering has received the Freedom of several locations throughout its history; these include:

- (England) 1983: Peterborough.

== See also ==
- List of Royal Air Force stations
