= 15th Marine Expeditionary Unit =

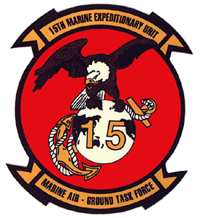
- 15th Marine Expeditionary Unit Insignia
- Founded: 1 July 1987
- Country: United States
- Branch: United States Marine Corps
- Type: Special Operations Capable - Marine Air Ground Task Force
- Role: Forward-deployed, rapid-response force
- Size: 2,200
- Part of: I Marine Expeditionary Force
- Garrison/HQ: Marine Corps Base Camp Pendleton
- Engagements: Somali Civil War: Operation Restore Hope; Operation Southern Watch Operation Stabilise; War on terror: Operation Enduring Freedom; Operation Iraqi Freedom

Commanders
- Current commander: Colonel Robb T. McDonald
- Notable commanders: Brian Beaudreault; Thomas D. Waldhauser; Robert R. Blackman Jr.

The 15th Marine Expeditionary Unit (15th MEU) is one of seven such units currently in existence in the United States Marine Corps. The Marine Expeditionary Unit (MEU) is a Marine Air Ground Task Force (MAGTF) with a strength of about 2,200 personnel. The MEU consists of a command element, a reinforced infantry battalion, a composite helicopter squadron and a combat logistics battalion. The 15th MEU is currently based out of Marine Corps Base Camp Pendleton, California.

== Mission ==
The mission of the MEU is to provide geographic combatant commanders with a forward-deployed, rapid-response force capable of conducting conventional amphibious and selected maritime operations at night or under adverse weather conditions from the sea, by surface and/or by air while under communications and electronics restrictions.

== Current subordinate units ==
- Ground Combat Element: 1st Battalion, 5th Marines
- Aviation Combat Element: VMM-165 (REIN)
- Logistics Combat Element: Combat Logistics Battalion 15

== History ==
=== Early years ===
In April 1983, the Commandant of the Marine Corps approved the original Marine Air-Ground Task Force (MAGTF) Headquarters concept, providing for the sourcing of two Marine Amphibious Unit (MAU) headquarters from each Marine Amphibious Brigade headquarters. The Commandant directed the establishment of two additional MAU headquarters in November 1985. As a result, the Headquarters, 15th Marine Amphibious Unit was activated 1 July 1987 at Camp Pendleton.

The Commandant directed the replacement of the title "Headquarters" with "Command Element" in the titles of the MAGTFs in August 1987. The 15th MAU's designation was further changed in February 1988 to the 15th Marine Expeditionary Unit. Both changes were made to more accurately reflect the operational and expeditionary nature of the MAGTF. Before World War II, and in the period between then and the Vietnam War, Marine units dispatched for overseas service were generally designated as "expeditionary brigades."

Since its activation in July 1987, the 15th MEU has trained to meet its mission in the rotation with the 11th and 13th MEUs to provide a continuous presence in the Western Pacific, Indian Ocean, and Persian Gulf and as a ready MAGTF in the continental United States.

In October 1989, the MEU assisted in relief efforts following the 1989 Loma Prieta earthquake, performing their assigned missions and also taking on several volunteer projects to help the victims of the disaster.

=== 1990s ===
Marines of the 15th MEU relieved the 1st Battalion, 24th Marines (1/24, 4th Marine Division) to continue the evacuation of the Republic of the Philippines in August 1991 after the eruption of Mount Pinatubo that had occurred six weeks earlier. Assistance lasted over a month as the Marines distributed food and medical supplies, evacuated stranded villagers and provided security to other rescue personnel.

The MEU spearheaded Operation Restore Hope on 9 December 1992, to provide humanitarian assistance to the civil war torn and famine-stricken country of Somalia. After a predawn landing, the Marines secured the capital city of Mogadishu, the international airport and maritime shipping port facilities, as well as the American Embassy, and quickly moved into other inland areas to protect food distribution convoys and patrol the streets to restore order. The MEU pushed into and secured the inland cities of Baidoa and Balidogle and the coastal town of Kismayo in order to establish relief efforts and maintain security. The span of operations for the Battalion Landing Team was over 150 miles (240 km).

During its deployment in 1994, the MEU provided a detachment of CH-53Es to assist in the Rwanda Relief Effort. The detachment, based in Entebbe, Uganda, provided the only heavy lift capability to the joint task force commander. A few weeks later the MEU assisted in the relocation of the United States Liaison Office from Mogadishu, Somalia, to Nairobi, Kenya.

In October 1994, the MEU was called on again to provide a quick reaction force to counter any possible Iraqi aggression against Kuwait. Within 48 hours, the MEU sent Marines ashore in Kuwait City to demonstrate U.S. resolve in maintaining peace and security in the area.

In January 1996, July 1997, and October 1998, AV-8B Harriers from the 15th MEU (SOC) participated in Operation Southern Watch, patrolling the No-fly zone over southern Iraq maintaining continuous surveillance of the Kuwait-Iraq border, and to ensure the Iraqi military did not violate any United Nations resolutions passed since the Gulf War.

During its 2000 deployment, the 15th MEU (SOC) also participated in the Australian-led Operation Stabilise, providing desperately needed assistance to the people of East Timor, and again patrolled the skies over Southern Iraq in support of Operation Southern Watch.

=== Global war on terrorism ===
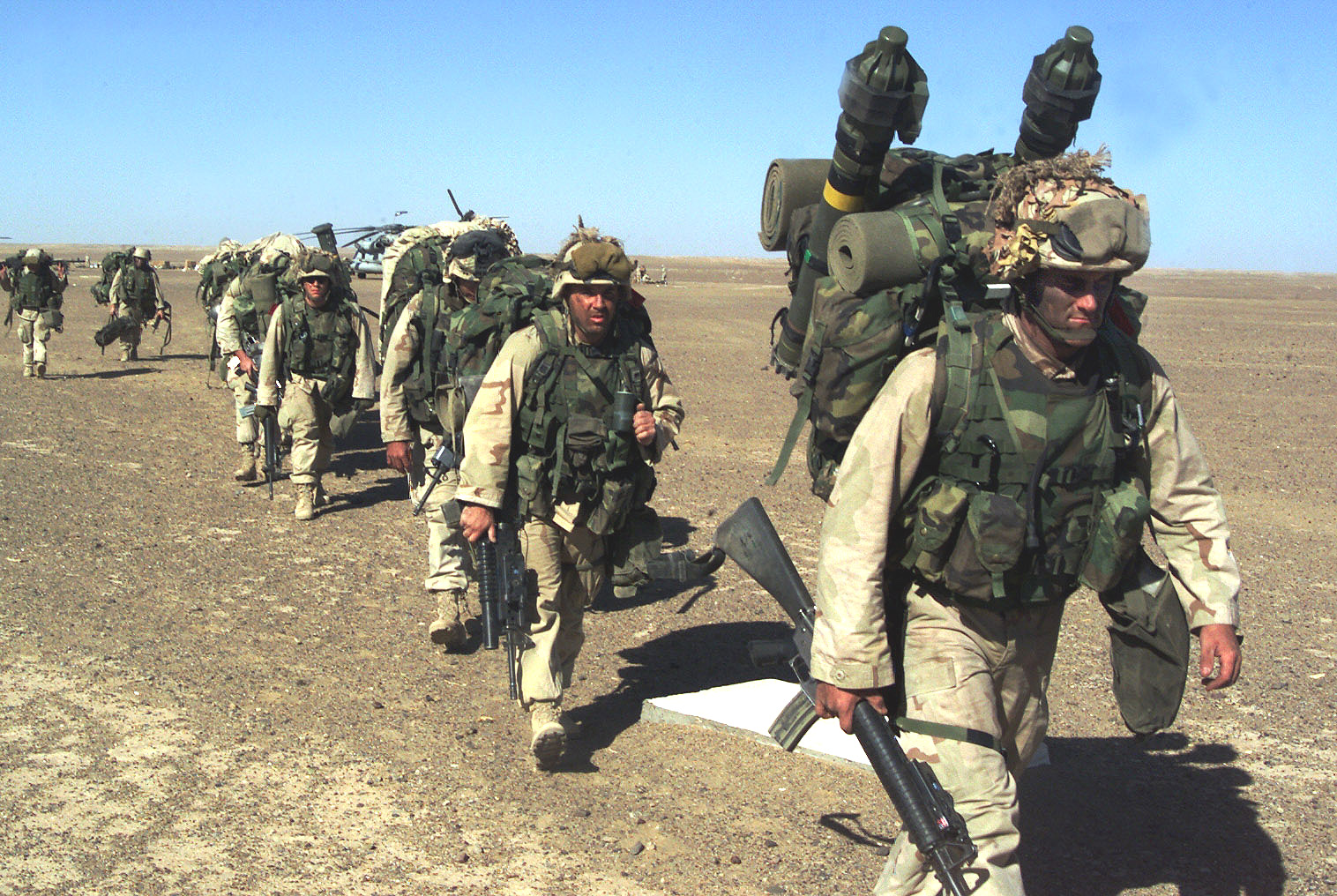
Marines from the 15th MEU in Afghanistan on 25 November 2001

Marines of the Forward Command Element of the 15th MEU (SOC) were in East Timor readying for the arrival of the ARG to conduct Humanitarian Operations, while the ARG was in Darwin, Australia during the September 2001 terror attacks on the United States. Following the 11 September attacks on the World Trade Center and the Pentagon, the 15th MEU (SOC) continued their plans of humanitarian operations to assist the war-torn country of East Timor, before sailing to the North Arabian Sea in support of Operation Enduring Freedom.

On 7 October 2001, the 15th MEU participated in the United States' new "war on terrorism", sending Marines and Sailors into Northern Pakistan to establish a forward operating air base and logistical hub. These Marines provided security to USAF personnel who arrived on location shortly after the 15th MEU Marines of Battalion Landing Team 1/1 had established security.

On 25 November 2001, the Marines and Sailors of the 15th MEU (SOC) conducted an Amphibious assault over 400 miles (640 km) into the land-locked country of Afghanistan. The Marines and Sailors set new standards for Marine Corps amphibious doctrine. Landing at a remote airbase, 90 miles (140 km) southwest of Kandahar, the Marines occupied Camp Rhino that had been secured by the U.S. Army special forces, America's first Forward Operating Base while maintaining the first significant conventional ground presence in Afghanistan. The Marines and coalition forces later moved north to Kandahar International Airport securing a new forward operating base. With the move, the Marines and coalition forces were able to continue with new missions and build a prison camp that housed numerous Taliban and Al-Qaeda fighters.

On 6 January 2003, this time on board the USS Tarawa ARG, the 15th MEU (SOC) departed once again for another deployment. In mid-February, elements of the MEU off-loaded and established a training camp in Northern Kuwait while other members of the MAGTF – primarily the helicopter squadron – remained on board the Tarawa ARG in the Persian Gulf.

During February and March 2003, tactical control (TACON) of the MEU was assigned to the United Kingdom's 3 Commando Brigade Royal Marines for Operation Iraqi Freedom. On 21 March 2003, Marines from the 15th MEU crossed the border into Southern Iraq and secured the ports of Umm Qasr and Az Zubayr in order to destroy Iraqi resistance and enable follow-on humanitarian assistance to begin.

In late-March 2003, the MEU again became part of the I Marine Expeditionary Force and moved to An Nasiriyah, Iraq to relieve the Marines of Task Force Tarawa. In An Nasiriyah, the 15th MEU secured the remaining sectors of the city, conducted a supporting attack during the rescue of American prisoner of war Jessica Lynch and continued to establish security throughout the greater An Nasiriyah area. The MEU provided humanitarian assistance to the local population that included purifying drinking water, and doctors and corpsmen assisted medical care. The MEU began helping establish the local government to include police and other local services in addition to continuing to conduct airborne surveillance and direct-action raids on the ground to seek out and capture any Ba’ath Party or Fedayeen resistance.

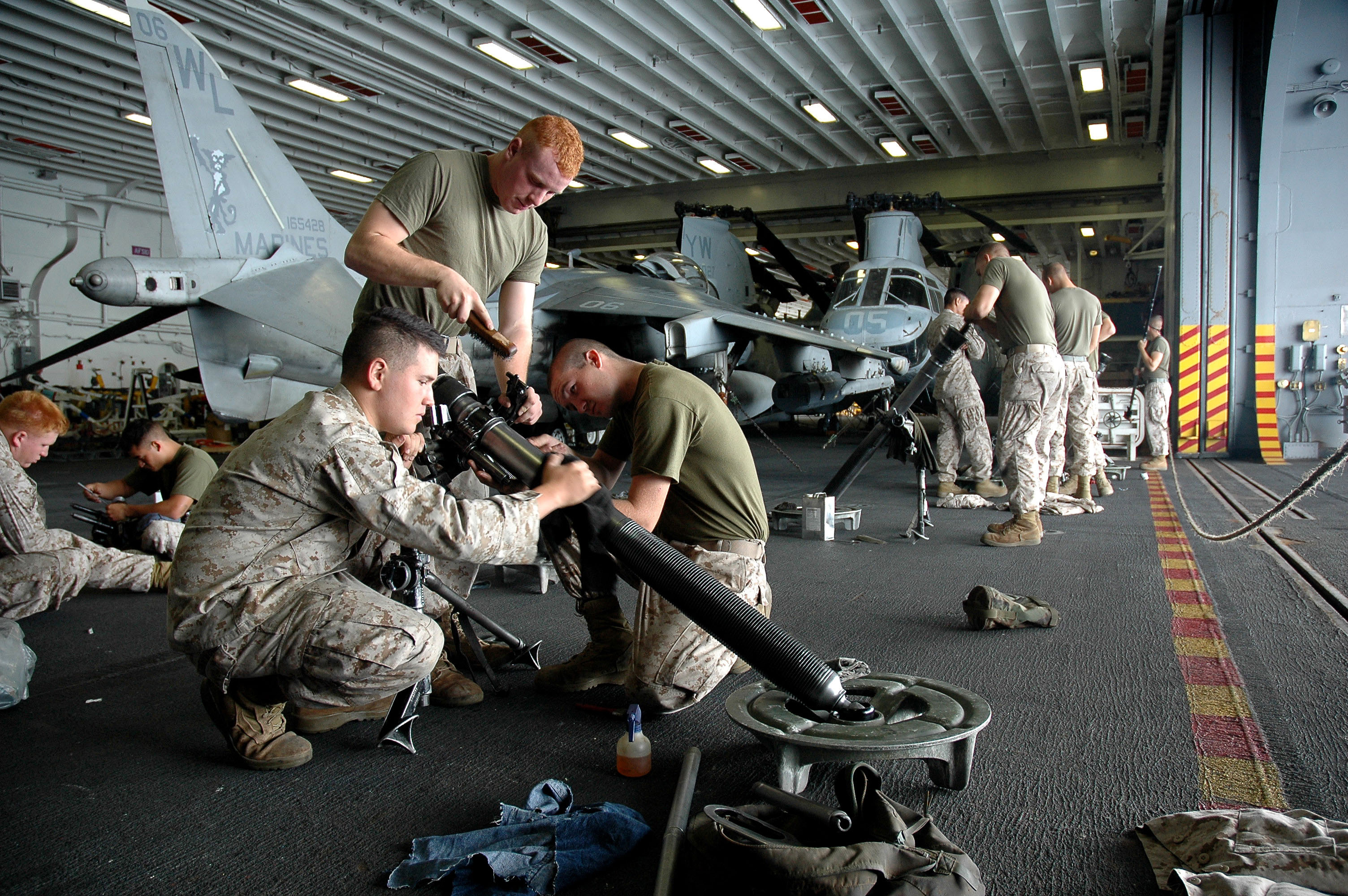
Marines perform maintenance on their equipment in the hangar bay of USS Boxer.

In January 2005, the 15th MEU participated in Operation Unified Assistance by providing disaster relief to survivors of the destructive tsunami in Sumatra, Indonesia and southern Sri Lanka. Immediately after wrapping up those operations, the 15th MEU proceeded south of Baghdad, Iraq to Forward Operating Base Falcon near Al-Mahmudiyah, Babil province, south of for security and stability operations in between rotations of army units. Their deployment into Iraq lasted about 30 days.

On 13 September 2006, the 15th MEU was once again deployed to Iraq. It left San Diego on USS Boxer, USS Dubuque, and USS Comstock and in mid November began operating in Al Anbar province as Task Force Bullrush, composed of elements of the 15th Marine Expeditionary Unit (Special Operations Capable); Bravo Company, 3rd Reconnaissance Battalion; C Company, 1st Light Armored Reconnaissance Battalion, and Alpha Company, 3rd Platoon, 1st Combat Engineer Battalion.

On 11 February 2007, the unit received notice of its second extension of their deployment in support of President Bush's surge of additional forces into the critical areas of Iraq. While operating in Al Anbar, the MEU conducted combat operations in Rutbah, Barwana, Haditha, Haqlaniyah, Ramadi and Al Asad in support of Multinational Force-West. The unit returned to San Diego on 30 May 2007.

On 5 May 2008, the unit was deployed on a sea deployment to the Western Pacific & the Persian Gulf, aboard USS Peleliu (LHA-5), USS Dubuque (LPD-8), and USS Pearl Harbor (LSD-52).

On 2010, the unit was deployed to the Gulf of Aden for anti-piracy operations against pirates along the Somali coast. With 1st Battalion, 4th Marines as detachment, they were responsible for the 9 September recapturing of MV Magellan Star.

On 17 September 2012, the 15th MEU was deployed with the Peleliu Amphibious Ready Group (USS Peleliu, USS Green Bay, and USS Rushmore as a theater reserve and crisis response force throughout the U.S. Central Command and the U.S. 5th Fleet area of responsibility. The unit returned to Camp Pendleton 13 May 2013.

== 15th MEU Commanding Officers ==
| Col. Ted Hopgood July 1987-April 1990 | Col. Terrence P. Murray 1990-1992 |
| Col. Gregory S. Newbold 1992-1993 | Col. Robert R. Blackman Jr. 1993-1995 |
| Col. William A. Whitlow 1995-1997 | Col. R.C. Zilmer 1997-2000 |
| Col. Thomas D. Waldhauser 2000-2003 | Col. T.C. Greenwood 2003-2005 |
| Col. Brian D. Beaudrault 2005-2008 | Col. R.A. Osborn 2008-2011 |
| Col. S.D. Campbell 2011-2013 | LtCol J. R. O’Neal 2013-2014 |
| Col. Vance L. Cryer 2014-2016 | Col. J.R. Clearfield 2016-2018 |
| Col. Jay M. Holtermann 2018-2019 | Col. Christopher J. Bronzi 2019-2021 |
| Col. Fridrik Fridriksson 2021 | Col. Sean Dynan June 2021-Jan 2025 |
| Col. Robb T. McDonald Jan 2025 - present | - |

== See also ==
- Marine Air-Ground Task Force
- Marine expeditionary unit
- Organization of the United States Marine Corps

== Bibliography ==
=== Web ===
- 15th MEU's Official website Archived 15 February 2013 at the Wayback Machine Link updated on 2024-12-27.
- Grant, Rebecca (June 2004). "Marine Air in the Mainstream" (PDF). Air & Space Forces Magazine. Vol. 87, no. 6. Archived (PDF) from the original on 23 November 2025.
- "JTF Humanitarian Assistance Operations From 1983 Through 1993". Army.mil. Archived from the original on 29 April 2005.
- "Appendix A – Navy-Marine Corps Crisis Response and Combat Actions". Vision... Presence... Power: A Program Guide to the U.S. Navy – 2000 Edition. U.S. Navy. Archived from the original on 19 August 2006.
- "U.S. Marines destroy pocket of resistance in Umm Qasr". CNN. 23 March 2003.
- "15th Marine Expeditionary Unit". Forces: U.S. & Coalition/Marines, War in Iraq. CNN. 2003. Archived from the original on 5 September 2006.
