= Robert R. Blackman Jr. =

United States Marine Corps officer

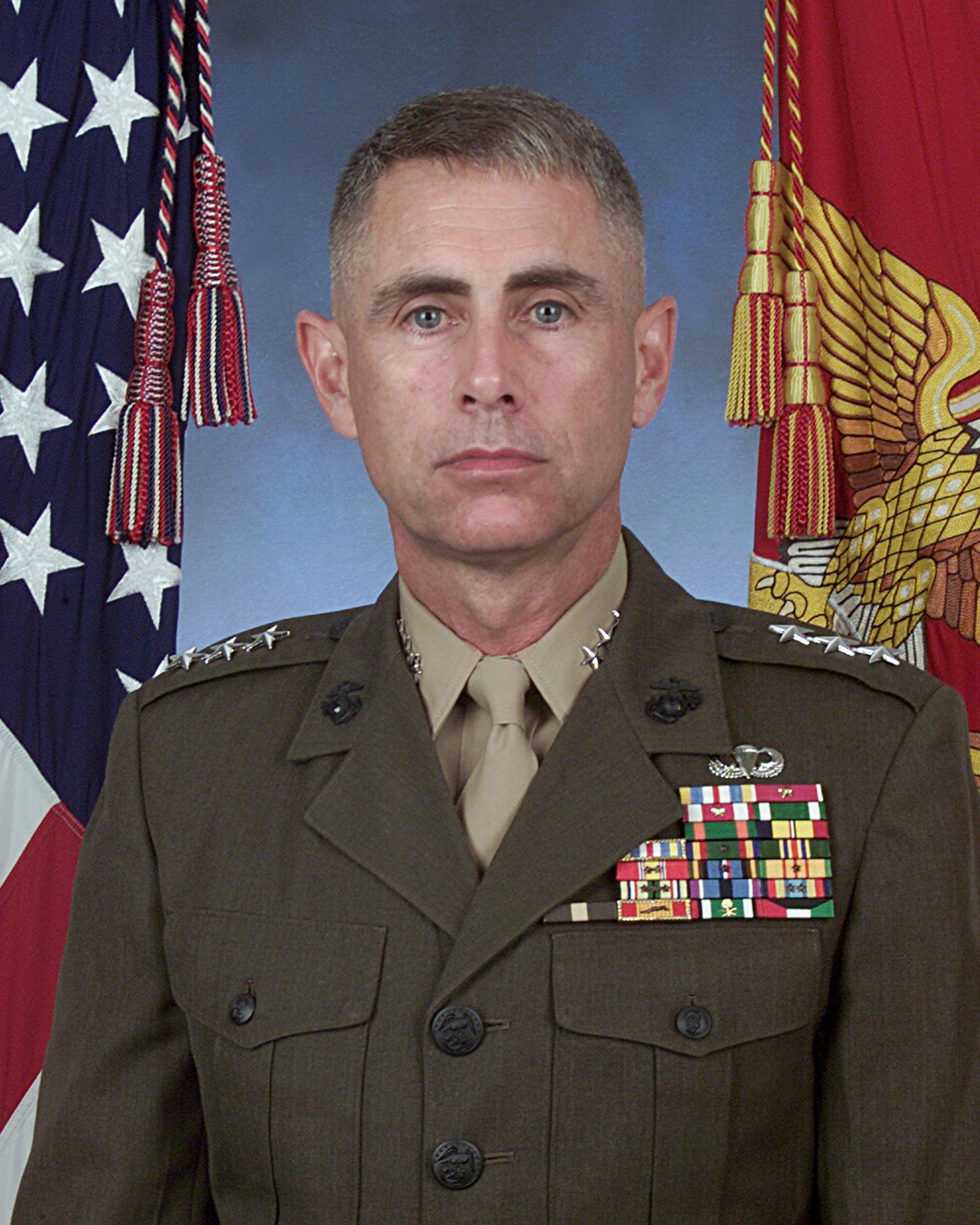
- Born: June 27, 1948 (age 78); Orange, New Jersey, U.S.
- Education: Cornell University
- Military career
- Allegiance: United States
- Branch: United States Marine Corps
- Service years: 1970–2007
- Rank: Lieutenant general
- Nickname: "Rusty"
- Commands: United States Marine Corps Forces Command; III Marine Expeditionary Force; 2nd Marine Division; 15th Marine Expeditionary Unit; 3rd Battalion, 8th Marines
- Conflicts: Gulf War
- Awards: Defense Superior Service Medal; Legion of Merit

Robert R. Blackman Jr. (born June 27, 1948) is a retired lieutenant general in the United States Marine Corps who served as commanding general of United States Marine Corps Forces Command from 15 August 2005 until his retirement on September 1, 2007. Blackman also commanded United States Marine Corps Forces, Europe; United States Marine Corps Forces, South; United States Marine Corps Bases, Atlantic; United States Fleet Marine Force, Atlantic; and United States Fleet Marine Force, Europe.

== Career ==
Blackman was commissioned upon graduation from Cornell University in June 1970. After completing The Basic School, he served as a platoon commander and company executive officer in 1st Battalion, 4th Marines. In March 1972, he reported to Marine Corps Recruit Depot San Diego, where he served as a series commander and Director of the Sea School until July 1975.

Following Amphibious Warfare School, Blackman served as S-3A and a rifle company commander in 3rd Battalion, 1st Marines. Assigned to the 3d Marine Division in January 1980, he served as the S-3 for 2nd Battalion, 4th Marines. Upon return to the U.S., he served as the Plans Officer in the Officer Assignment Branch at Headquarters Marine Corps. After graduation from the Marine Corps Command and Staff College in June 1985, he was assigned to the Air-Ground Exchange Program with MAG-26 where he served as the S-3A and S-3.

Blackman reported to the 2d Marine Division in June 1987, and was assigned as the Executive Officer of the 8th Marines. In May 1988, he assumed command of 3rd Battalion, 8th Marines. Following the return of BLT 3/8 from a Mediterranean deployment with the 22nd Marine Expeditionary Unit, he was assigned to Top Level School as a Fellow in National Security Affairs at the Kennedy School of Government. In August 1990, Blackman was assigned to the Operations Division at Headquarters Marine Corps. From there he was assigned as the G-3 Operations Officer for COMMARCENT (Forward) in Southwest Asia. Upon return to CONUS in March 1991, he was reassigned as Head, Current Operations Branch, Headquarters Marine Corps.

In July 1991, Blackman reported to United States Central Command for duty as the Commander in Chief's Executive Officer. In August 1993, he assumed command of the 15th Marine Expeditionary Unit. Upon completion of his tour with the Marine Expeditionary Unit, in March 1995, he assumed duties as the Military Assistant to the Secretary of the Navy. In August 1996, he was assigned as the President of the Marine Corps University. He was promoted to brigadier general on October 1, 1996.

In July 1998, Blackman was assigned as the Assistant Division Commander, 2nd Marine Division, Camp Lejeune, North Carolina. He commanded the 2nd Marine Division from June 1999 to July 2001. Upon arrival at USCENTCOM in August 2001, he assumed duties as Director, Resources and Assessment, J8, United States Central Command MacDill Air Force Base, Florida.

In October 2002, Blackman was assigned as the Chief of Staff for Coalition Forces Land Component Command during Operation Iraqi Freedom. In July 2003, he served as the Commanding General, III Marine Expeditionary Force; Commander, Marine Corps Bases, Japan; and Commander, Marine Forces Japan. His final assignment was as Commanding General of United States Marine Corps Forces Command from 15 August 2005 until his retirement on September 1, 2007.

== Personal life ==
On February 4, 2011, the Marine Corps Heritage Foundation announced Blackman's appointment as President and Chief Executive Officer.
