= Camp Rhino =

Defunct U.S. military base

Camp Rhino
- Registan Desert in Afghanistan
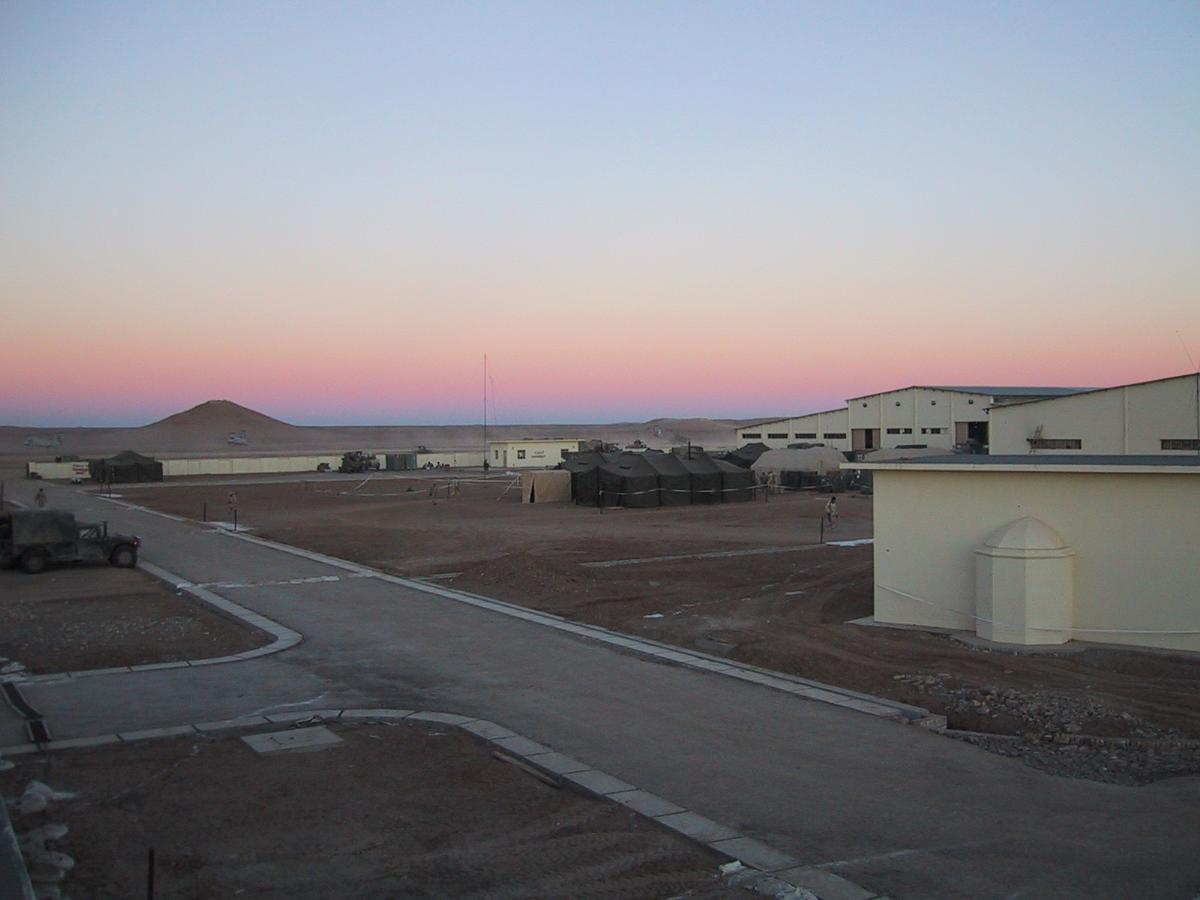
- FOB Rhino, December 2001

Site information
- Owner: United States Marine Corps (USMC)

Location
- Shown within Afghanistan
- Coordinates: 30°29′12″N 64°31′32″E

Site history
- Built: 2001
- In use: 2001–2002

Airfield information
- Elevation: 3,209 feet (978 m) AMSL
Helipads
Number	Length and surface
13/31	6,800 feet (2,073 m) gravel

Forward operating base (FOB) Rhino, also known as Camp Rhino, was a U.S. military base located in the Registan Desert of Afghanistan, 100 nautical miles (190 km) southwest of Kandahar. It was the first U.S. land base established in Afghanistan during Operation Enduring Freedom and was in use from November 2001 to January 2002.

== History ==
The area Camp Rhino was built on is a remote desert hunting camp for Arabs and their falcons. Built up over the years by migratory bird-seeking Arabs, it is an isolated airstrip in the middle of the Afghan Registan desert. It is only a few buildings, some walls, roads, and a hard surface runway. There is no water except what is brought in by air.

The site was kept under observation by United States Navy SEALs for four days prior to Operation Rhino led by the United States Army's 75th Ranger Regiment (3rd Ranger Battalion). The raid included both Airborne and Air Assault insertions. Objective Rhino was then handed off to U.S. Marines from the 15th Marine Expeditionary Unit (15th MEU) and Charlie Company BLT 1/1 (Battalion Landing Team) and used to build up a coalition footprint to conduct leading combat operations in Helmand and Kandahar provinces.

The attacking Rangers and parachutists found the facility was surrounded by a 10-foot (3 m) wall and four hardened guard towers. Within the facility there were numerous new warehouses, offices, and even a secret mosque which was declared off limits to all personnel as a sign of respect. The paint on some of the buildings was barely dry. Sealed roads ran throughout the camp, and it was also bisected by a 3-foot-deep (0.91 m) cement moat.

On November 25, 2001, TF 58 launched its initial assault. Marine helicopters and KC-130s supported by Air Force special operations personnel inserted lightly armed forces into Rhino. Within minutes personnel established the necessary lighting on the airfield to receive the first fixed-wing aircraft. The first Marine KC-130 arrived less than an hour later with more personnel, fuel and water. Over the first five nights, KC-130s would fly more than 200 sorties.

Camp Rhino was occupied from 26 November 2001 to 1 January 2002. At its peak, the camp contained about 1100 U.S. Marines, under command of Brigadier General James Mattis, as well as U.S. soldiers and U.S. Navy Seabees, Australia Special Air Service Regiment (SASR), and dozens of embedded reporters.

== Strategic importance ==
Camp Rhino was the U.S.-led coalition's first strategic foothold in Afghanistan and made the ground war in Afghanistan possible. While Rhino was being established, fierce battles between Taliban and Northern Alliance troops were still underway near Kandahar. But then the Taliban, realizing that U.S. forces were now very close and were willing to operate at night, capitulated and retreated north to the mountains of Tora Bora.

A Light Armored Reconnaissance Element of the 15th Marine Expeditionary Unit and coalition forces, supported by 26th MEU, deployed forward to capture the Taliban stronghold of Kandahar International Airport in mid-December 2001, following a three-week period of consolidation at Rhino. Kandahar International Airport then became the main coalition base in southern Afghanistan, while Bagram Air Base was established further to the north near Kabul. The majority of forces who had initially based at Rhino had re-located to Kandahar (Camp Nathan Smith) by Christmas Day, mostly transported by fixed-wing transport aircraft.

== See also ==
- Kandahar International Airport
- List of military operations in the war in Afghanistan (2001–2021)
- Participants in Operation Enduring Freedom
- Camp Phoenix
