= 2009 Kandahar bombing =

Terroristic attack

25 August 2009 Kandahar bombing
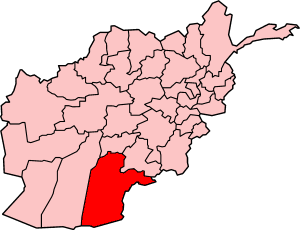
- Kandahar province within Afghanistan
- Location: Kandahar, Kandahar Province, Afghanistan
- Date: 25 August 2009
- Attack type: suicide truck bombing
- Deaths: 43
- Injuries: At least 65
- Perpetrator: Taliban

The 25 August 2009 Kandahar bombing was a suicide truck bombing that killed 43 people and injured at least 65 in Kandahar, Afghanistan. The Taliban were thought to be responsible.

A wedding hall and a dozen houses were destroyed in the explosion. The target was apparently the headquarters of a Japanese construction company.
