= Shahr-e Sukhteh =

Archaeological site in Sistan and Baluchistan Province, Iran

- شهر سوخته (Persian)
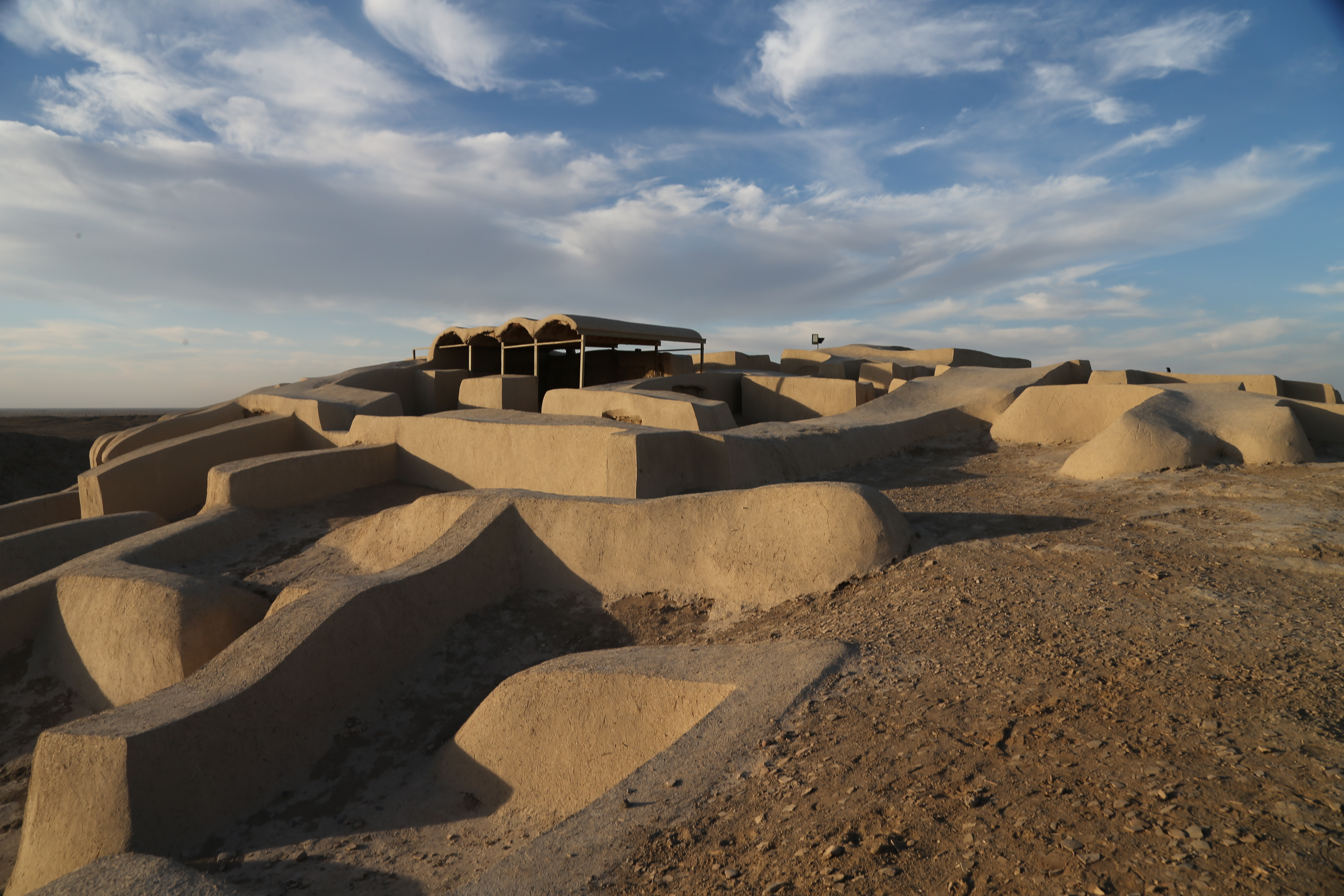
- The site in 2016

- Location in Iran Shahr-e Sukhteh (West and Central Asia)
- 30°35′43″N 61°19′35″E
- Type: Settlement
- Periods: Late Chalcolithic, Bronze Age
- Cultures: Helmand culture
- Location: Sistan and Baluchestan province, Iran

History
- Built: c. 3550 BC
- Abandoned: c. 2300 BC

Site notes
- Condition: In ruins
- Public access: yes (08:00–19:00)

UNESCO World Heritage Site
- Official name: Shahr-i Sokhta
- Type: Cultural
- Criteria: ii, iii, iv
- Designated: 2014 (38th session)
- Reference no.: 1456
- Region: Asia-Pacific

Iran National Heritage List
- Official name: Shahr-e Sukhteh
- Type: Archaeological Site
- Designated: 1966
- Reference no.: 542
- Conservation organization: Cultural Heritage, Handicrafts and Tourism Organization of Iran

Shahr-e Sukhteh (Persian: شهر سوخته, lit. 'Burnt City'), c. 3550–2300 BC, also spelled Shahr-e Sūkhté and Shahr-i Sōkhta, is an archaeological site of a sizable Bronze Age urban settlement, associated with the Helmand culture. It is located in Sistan and Baluchistan Province, the southeastern part of Iran, on the bank of the Helmand River, near the Zahedan-Zabol road. It was placed on the UNESCO World Heritage List in June 2014.

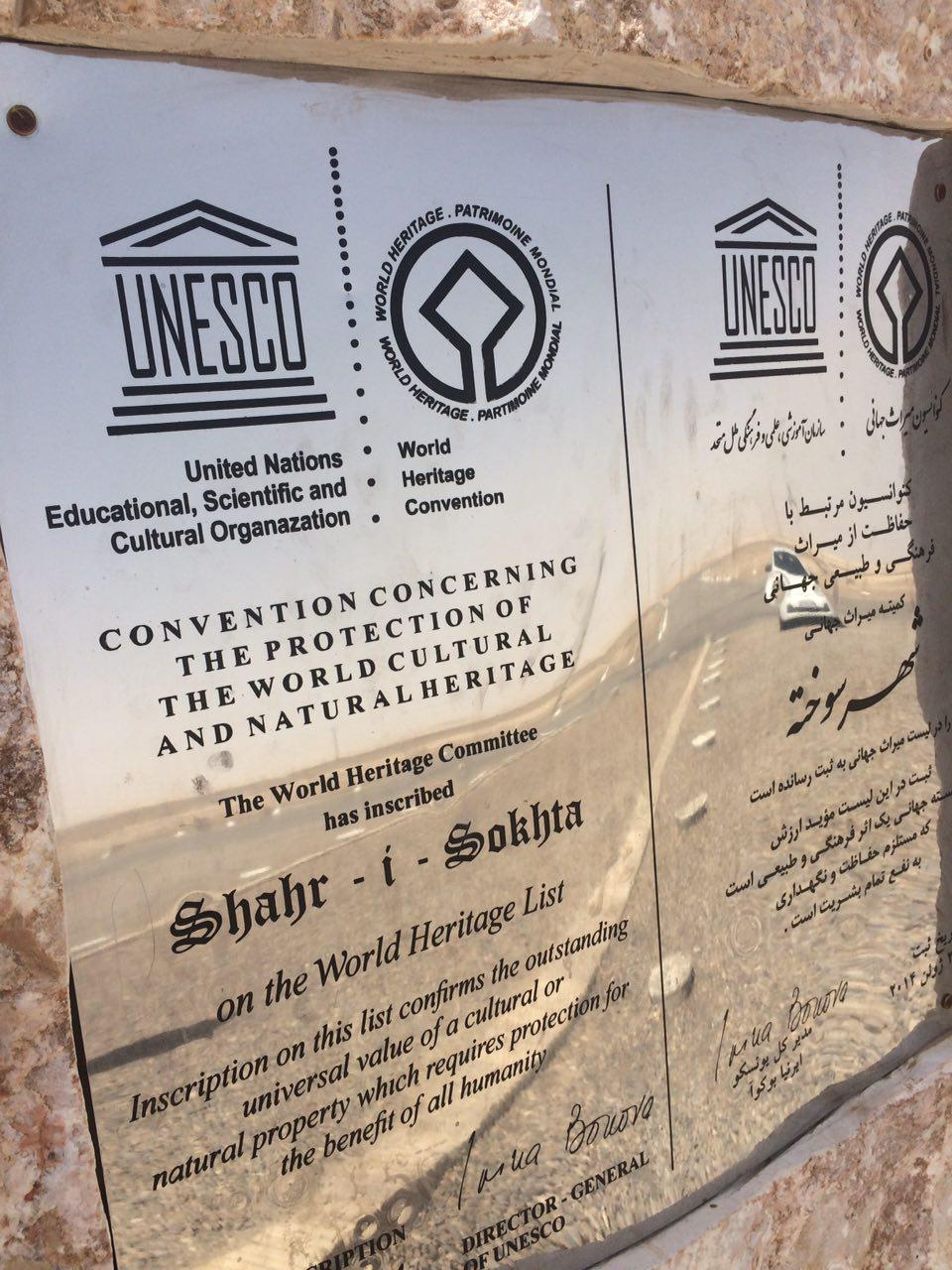
Plaque identifying Shahr-e Sukhteh registered as a UNESCO World Heritage Site

The reasons for the unexpected rise and fall of the city are still wrapped in mystery. Artifacts recovered from the city demonstrate a peculiar incongruity with nearby civilizations of the time and it has been speculated that Shahr-e Sukhteh might ultimately provide concrete evidence of a civilization east of prehistoric Iran that was independent of ancient Mesopotamia.

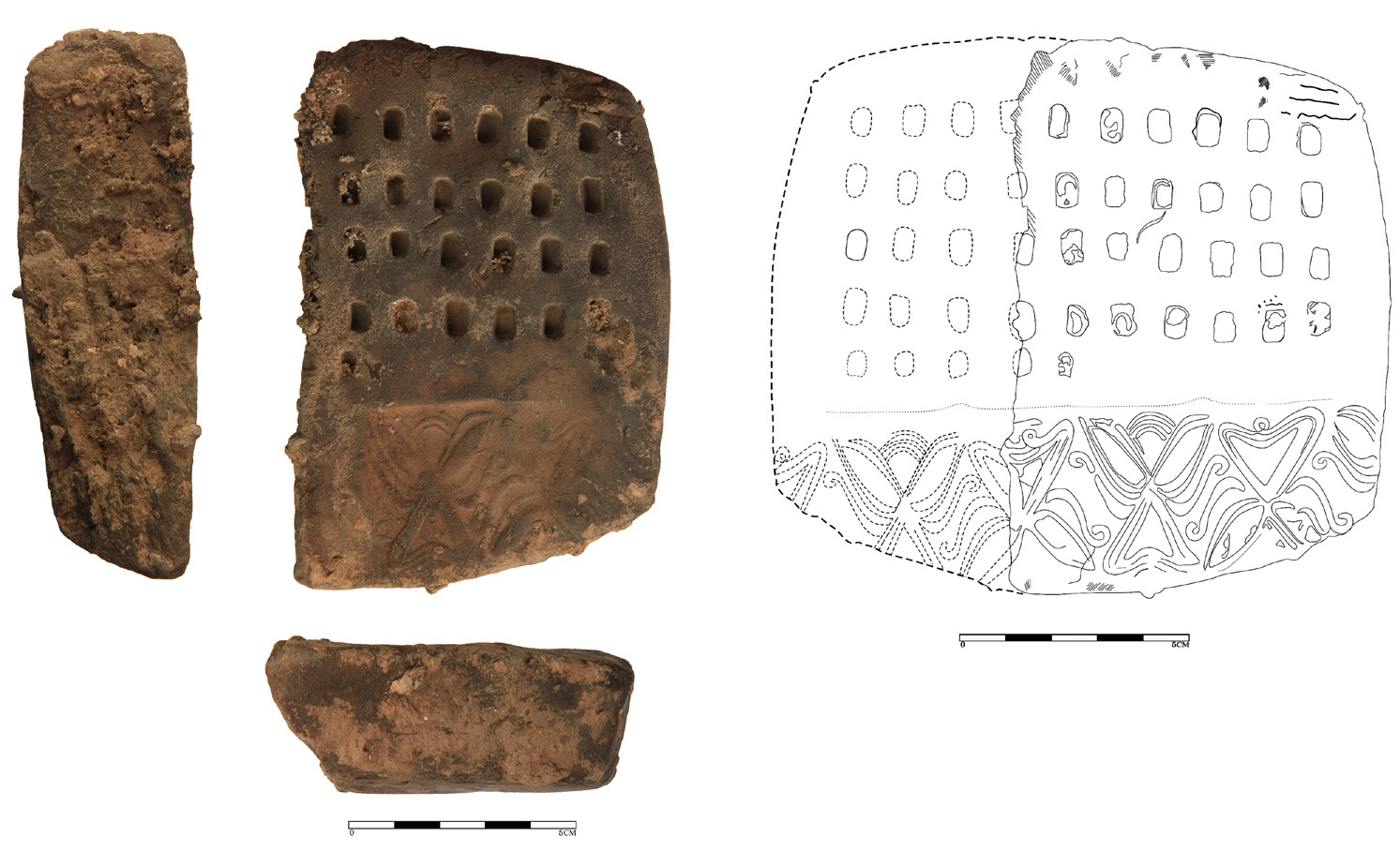
Proto-Elamite Tablets from Shahr-i Sokhta

== Archaeology ==
The site was discovered and investigated by Aurel Stein in the early 1900s.

Beginning in 1967, the site was excavated by the Istituto italiano per l'Africa e l'Oriente (IsIAO) team led by Maurizio Tosi. That work continued until 1978. After a gap, in 1997 work at the site was resumed by the Iranian Cultural Heritage and Tourism Organization team led by S.M.S. Sajjadi. New discoveries are reported from time to time.

The site was thought to cover an area of 151 ha (370 acres) but now the size is established at 200 ha (490 acres). The maximum built area was ca. 120 hectares. Shahr-e Sukhteh was one of the world's largest cities at the dawn of the urban era. It is located close to the eastern edge of what is now the Lut desert, one of the hottest places on Earth. The climate was far more welcoming in ancient times when the Hamun Lake, near which the city was located, was much greater in size, and there was a lot of marshland in the area. Also, Dahan-e Gholaman (550 BC–330 BC), a major Achaemenid center and archaeological site, is located only 50 km to the northeast.

In the southwestern part of Shahr-e Sukhteh there is a vast graveyard, measuring 25 ha (62 acres). It contains between 25,000 and 40,000 ancient graves.

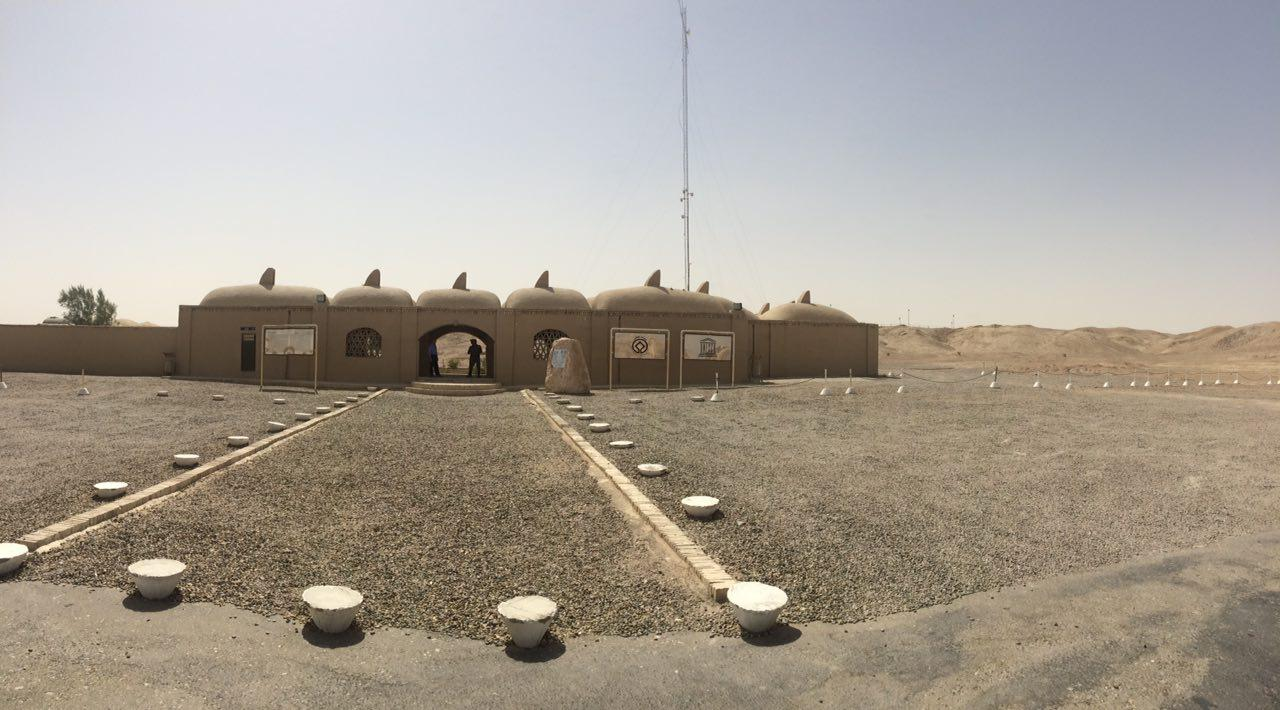
Entrance to the Burnt City

The settlement appeared around 3550 BC. As per Massimo Vidale's 2021 lecture, the city would have had four stages of civilization and would have been burnt down three times before being abandoned. This abandonment was thought previously to have taken place around 1800 BC by the Italian archaeological mission there, but research based on calibrated radiocarbon samples in nearby site Tappeh Graziani, by a mission of Italian and Iranian archaeologists led by Barbara Helwing and Hassan Fazeli Nashli, showed that the site was abandoned around 2350 BC. This abandonment is now considered to be around 2300 BC, and new chronological and stratigraphical sequence in the later excavations at Shahr-i Sokhta (2018–2019), published in 2022, based on areas 26, 33, 35, and 36 are as follows:

Period	Dating	Settlement size	Phase
IA	3550–3350 BC		10–9
IB	3350–3100 BC	10.5–15.5 ha	8
IC	3100–3000 BC		7
IIA	3000–2850 BC		6A-B
IIB	2850–2620 BC	80 ha	5A-B
IIC	2620–2600 BC		4
IIIA	2600–2450 BC	80 ha	3
IIIB	2450–2400 BC		2
IV	2400–2300 BC		1
GAP	2300–2100 BC		
V	2100–2000 BC		0

== Period I ==
During Period I, (ca. 3550–3000 BC), Shahr-e Sukhteh already shows close connections with the sites in southern Turkmenistan, with the Kandahar region of Afghanistan, the Quetta valley, and the Bampur valley in Iran. Also, there are connections with the Proto-Elamite cities of Ḵuzestān and Fārs.

Pottery during this period, in phases 10, 9, and 8, typically exhibits light paste colors for the body and rich decorations very similar to those found on ceramics from Mundigak III and eastern Baluchistan (particularly to Quetta valley), and decorative features similar to Namazga III ceramic. Also in this period, Grey Streak-Burnished Ware appeared, the same as in Tepe Yahya IVC, (c. 3400–3000 BC), and in Tepe Yahya IVB6), and fragments of polychromatic Nal pottery were present.

Around 3000 BC, potters in Shahr-e Sokhteh reproduced ceramic styles from distant Turkmenistan, located 750 km to the north, and other ceramics were imported from the Pakistani Kech-Makran—Iranian Balochistan area, located around 400–500 km to the south, and ceramics from the Mundigak (Kandahar) region in Afghanistan, around 400 km to the east, were also imported.

At the end of phase 7, ca. 3000 BC, most of the city was destroyed by a fire; particularly the Eastern Residential Area and the Central Quarters showed "rooms with burnt plaster, filled with ash and burnt remains of roof beams."

== Period II ==
During Period II (ca. 3000–2600 BC), Shahr-e Sukhteh was also in contact with the pre-Harappan centers of the Indus valley, and the contacts with the Bampur valley continued. During Phase 6 of this Period, the settlement was reconstructed, although some houses which were destroyed were not rebuilt. Recent excavations by Enrico Ascalone, in Area 33 of Shahr-i Sokhta, show that the so-called "House of the Architect" and the Eastern Building belong to a layer radiocarbon-dated from 3000 to 2850 BC.

The ruins of the building called "House of the Courts" were radiocarbon-dated by archaeologist Ascalone to 2850–2620 BC, and the next layer 2 was considered by him as a "squatter occupation" in Area 33, which he radiocarbon-dated to 2620–2600 BC. But, per archaeologist Sajjadi, the whole site of Shahr-i Sokhta reached in this period almost 80 ha (200 acres). It seems likely that contacts with Mundigak were close in this Period and that lapis lazuli arrived in Shahr-i Sokhta from mines of Badakshan moving through Mundigak, and the relations of both settlements made it possible for scholars to speak of a Helmand Civilization.

This Period, in phases 6 and 5, represented a time of significant development in both the size of the city and ceramic technology, as finer raw materials and advanced firing techniques used during this period resulted in ceramics with denser body-paste and pottery that were similar to those found in Bampur III-IV, but most of the ceramics that were produced and/or imported during this period were buff and gray wares with brown and black decorations. In phase 4 there was a change in the city with large buildings constructed with massive encircling walls, pottery lost the painted ornamentation and became standardized, and burials showed socio-economic differences among the population, but the goods previously imported from Mesopotamia and western Iran disappear at the end of this phase.

== Period III ==
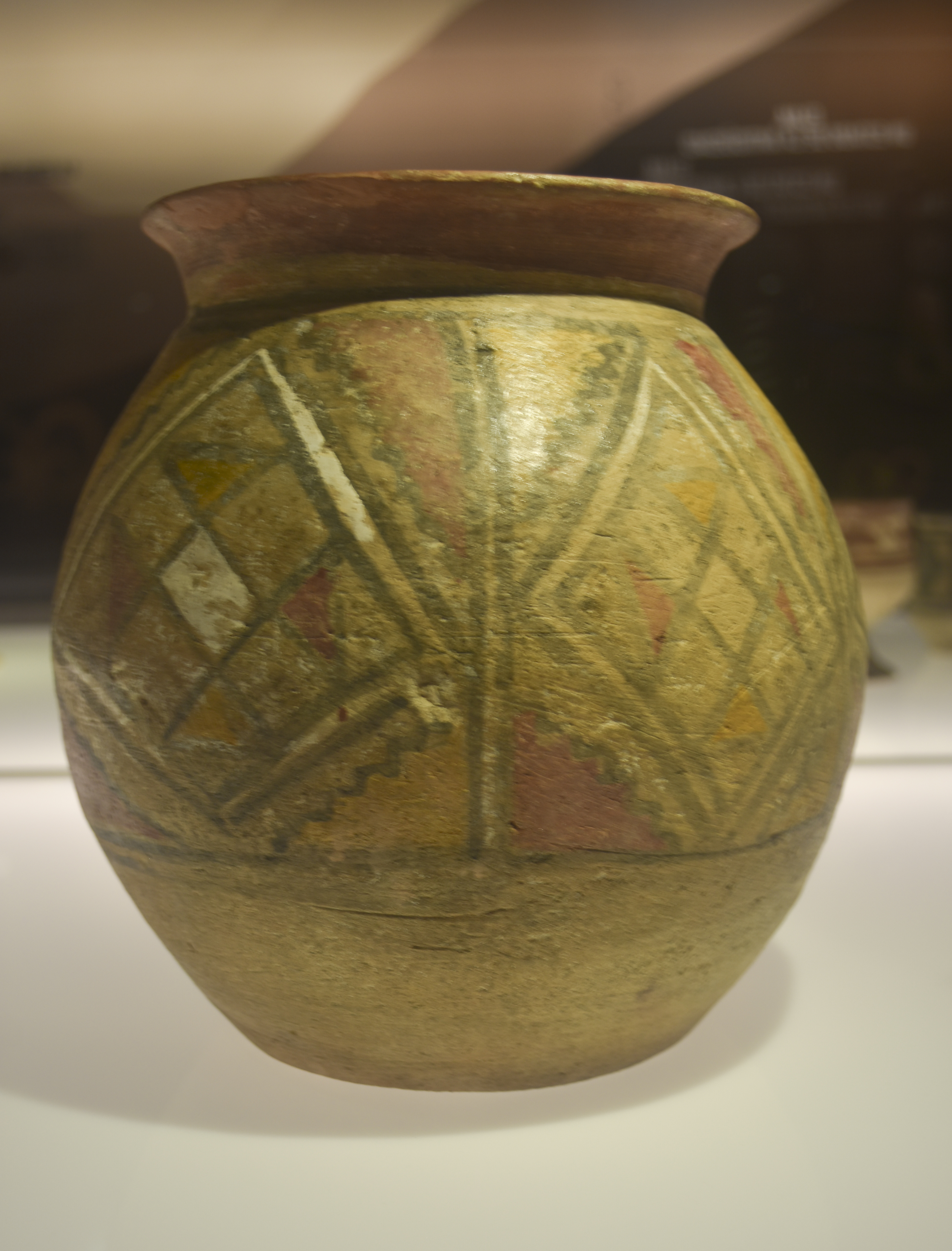
Bronze Age ceramic vase. c. 2600–2400 BC. Provenance: Shahr-i Sokhta, Iran. It is part of the exhibit 'Irán, Cuna de Civilizaciones' in the MARQ.

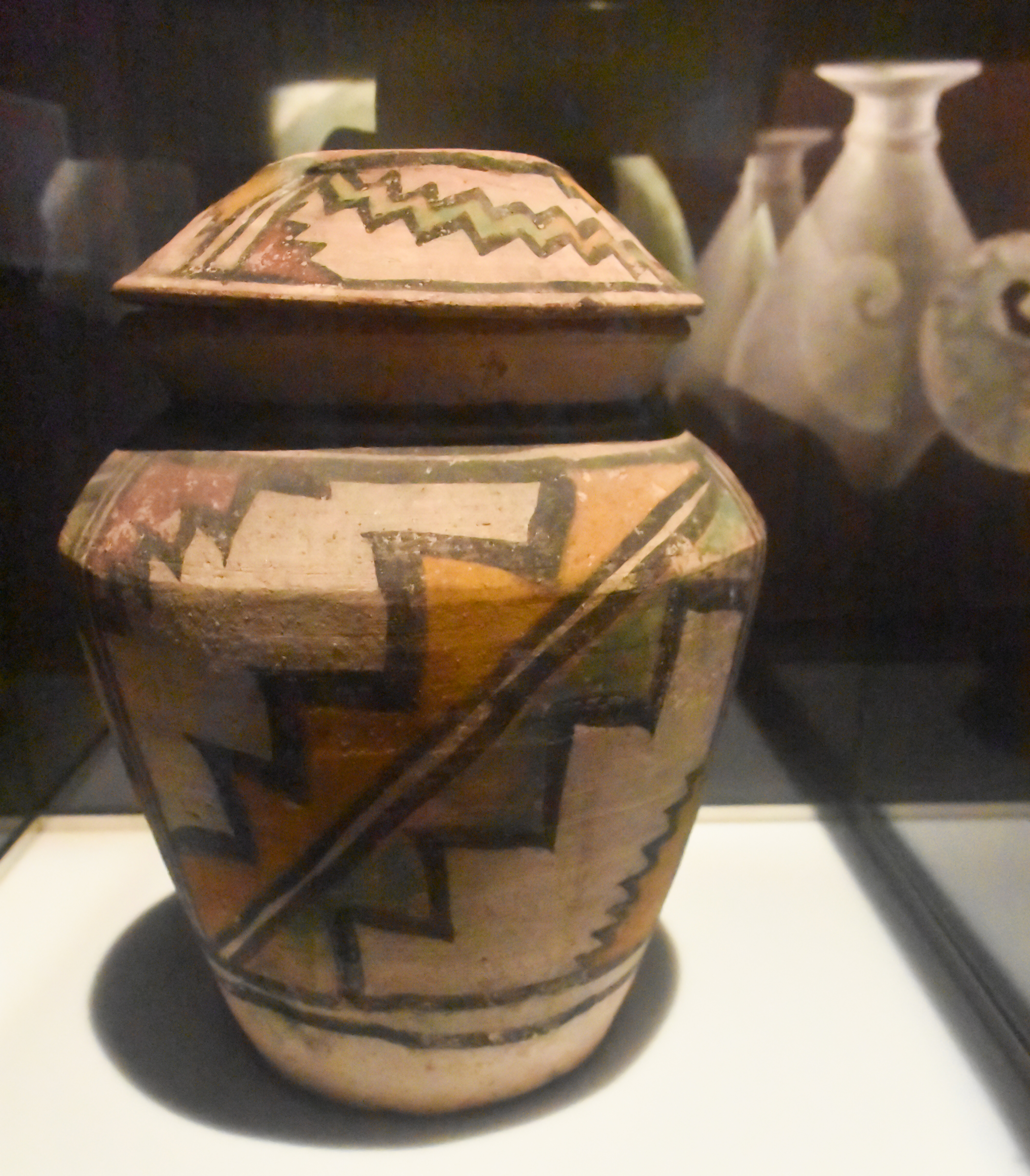
Bronze Age polychrome jar. c. 2600–2400 BC. Provenance: Shahr-i Sokhta, Iran. It is part of the exhibit 'Irán, Cuna de Civilizaciones' in the MARQ.

In phases 3 and 2 of Period III, (c. 2600–2400 BC), large buildings continued to be constructed with massive encircling walls, pottery lost the painted ornamentation of Period II and became standardized, and burials continued showing socio-economic differences among the population. The contacts and trade with Mundigak, Bampur and the cities of Indus civilization continue. The "Building 33" also belonging to Area 33 of Shahr-i Sokhta (located between the Central Quarters and the Monumental Area) was radiocarbon-dated by the team of Enrico Ascalone to 2600–2450 BC.

On the other hand, archaeologists Jarrige, Didier, and Quivron considered that Periods I, II, and III in Shahr-i Sokhta have archaeological links with Periods III and IV in Mundigak.

Pottery production during Period III in phase 3, had forms and depicted motifs that differed significantly from those featured by ceramics of the former periods, and at the beginning of this period, simple decorative motifs originally found on ceramics became more elaborated and gray-paste pottery with black decoration, similar to those found during Bampur IV and Tepe Yahya IV, became more present, and small undecorated bowls with thin bodies also appeared at the end of this period.

Abundant polychrome ceramics were found in graveyards, apparently used in religious rituals, and similar pottery was found at Nal in Baluchistan, Pakistan. Based on this fact some scholars concluded that polychrome ceramics in Shahr-i Sokhta were imported, but others such as Mugavero (2008) suggested that this pottery is local, as production of this type can be found at Shahr-i Sokhta's nearby sites of Tepe Dash and Tepe Rud-e Biyaban, located 3 km and 30 km south of Shahr-i Sokhta respectively.

== Period IV ==
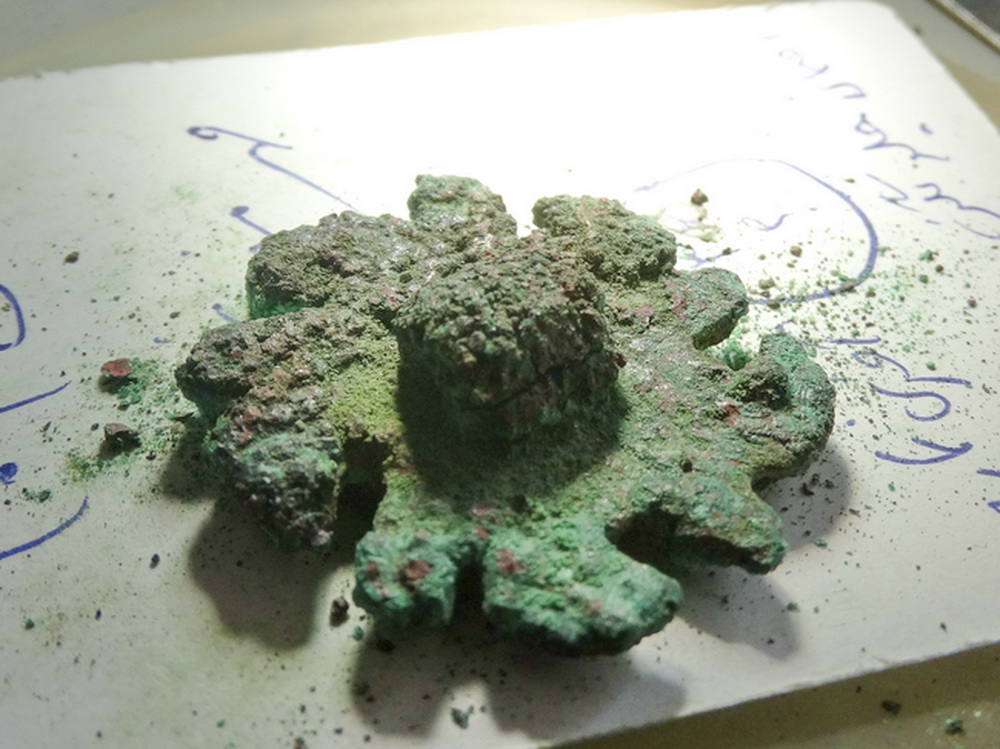
5,000 year old Sudarshan chakra discovered from Shahr-e Sukhteh

Period IV, (ca. 2400–2300 BC), was known by excavations in the "Burnt Palace" or "Burnt Building", and archaeologists consider that during this Period Shahr-i Sokhta had contacts with Bampur valley and Kandahar area almost exclusively, this is attested in typical Bampur V and VI pottery. Processing workshops were discovered in 1972 in the western quarters of the city with large concentrations of flint, lapis lazuli and turquoise, these sites are considered unique in the region. On the other hand, Enrico Ascalone, in his recent excavations, discovered a phase of abandonment in Area 33 of Shahr-i Sokhta, radiocarbon-dated to 2450–2350 BC. This phase, however, was considered recently by archaeologist Massimo Vidale as the last period of profusely developed urban occupation for the whole settlement of Shahr-i Sokhta.

Iranian archaeologists S.M.S. Sajjadi and Hossein Moradi, during excavation season (2014–15), found a system of semi-columns in a long passage between two buildings in area 26 of Shahr-i Sokhta's Period IV, and Massimo Vidale considers it is part of a "fully palatial" compound with very similar semi-columns to those in Mehrgarh found years ago by the French mission that dated them around 2500 BC.

== Period V ==
On the other hand, Ascalone, in his lecture admits in a chronological graphic, that after abandonment between 2350 and 2200 BC the "Burnt Building" in Shahr-i Sokhta was inhabited in Period V, (ca. 2100–2000 BC), based on calibrated radiocarbon datings presented by archaeologist Raffaele Biscione in 1979, but this can be a unique survival of previous urban occupation, as Massimo Vidale comments that the "urban system" did not go beyond 2350 BC. M. Tosi and R. Biscione who excavated many years ago this "Burnt Building" considered it was "destroyed in a ruinous firing" around 2000 BC.

== Sectors of the city ==
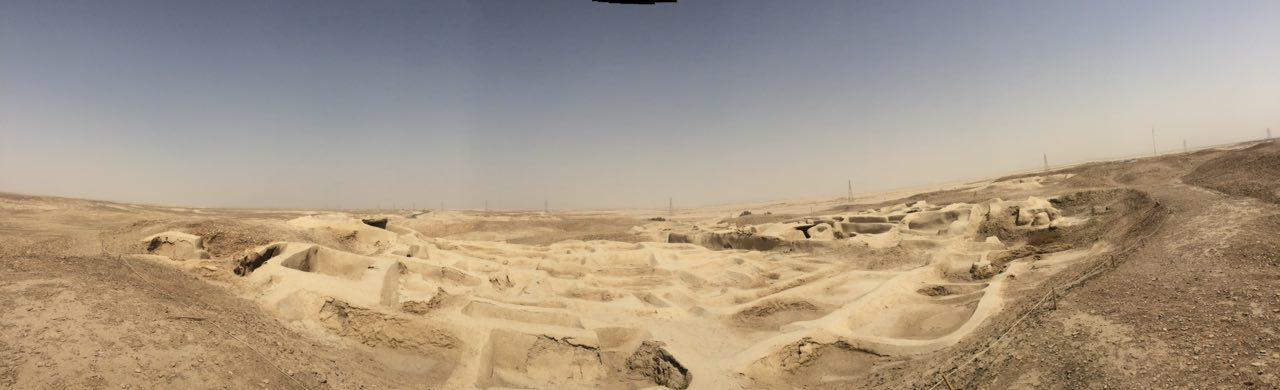
Eastern residential area of Shahr-e Sukhteh

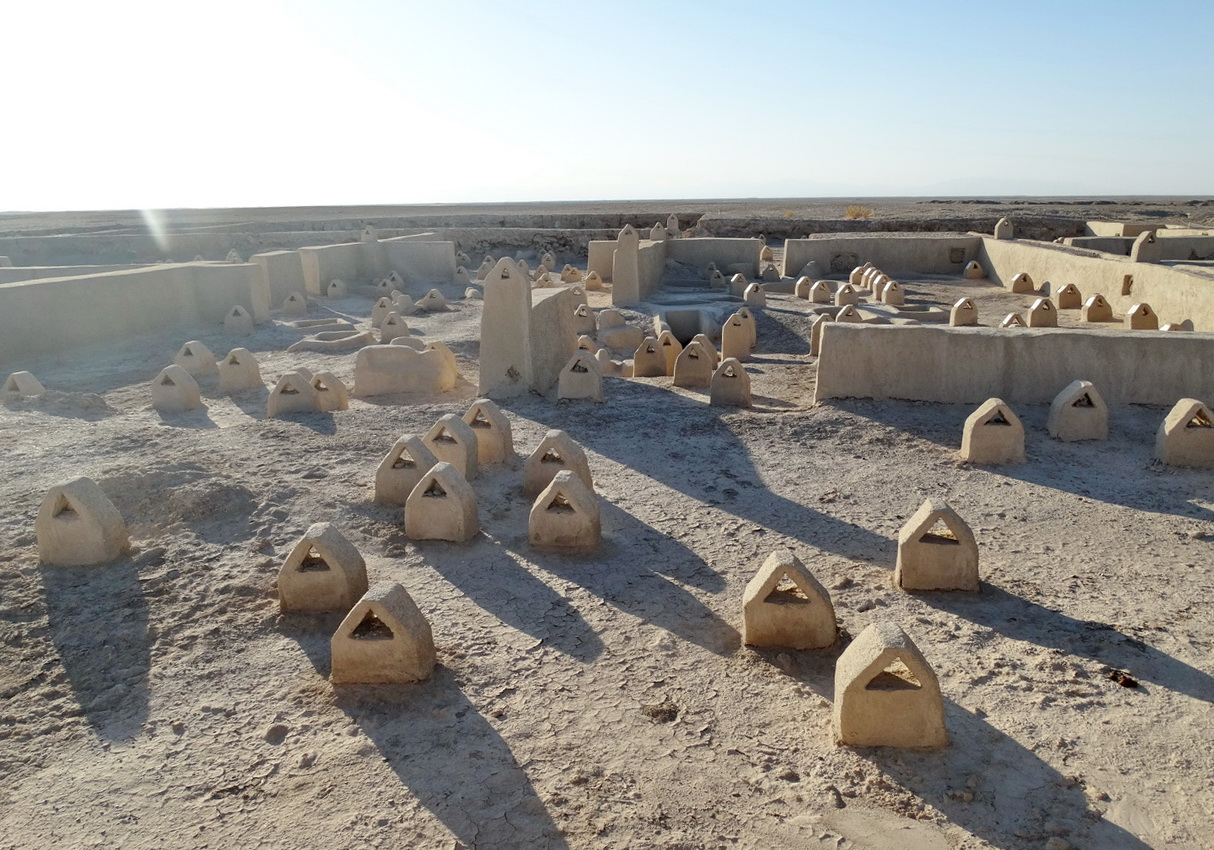
Cemetery Shahr-e Sukhteh

The area of Shahr-e Sukhteh is divided into five main sectors, as mentioned by archaeologist S.M.S. Sajjadi:

1. The Eastern Residential Area, located in the highest point of the site. Some pottery belonging to Period I was found in excavations within this Eastern Residential Area to the north of the Burnt Building.

2. The Great Central Area, or Central Quarters, separated from the western, southern and eastern areas by deep depressions. Within these Central Quarters there is a place known as "House of the Jars", where among other pottery a Kot Dijian jar was found.

3. The Craftsman Quarters, found in the north-western part of the site.

4. The Monumental Area, located east of the Craftsman Quarters with several high hills representing different architectural buildings. Some pottery kilns were found in the north- western part of the site near and around the Monumental Area, but most vessels were produced out of the town.

5. The Graveyard Area, also called the Cemetery of Shahr-e Sokhteh, which occupies the southwestern part of the site covering almost 25 ha (62 acres). The estimated number of graves ranges between 25,000 and 40,000, and most of the burials are dated to Period I and Period II, although some other few burials are from next two periods.

== Finds ==
Reproduction of the images on a pottery goblet found in Shahr-e Sookhteh (c. 3178 BC) now in the National Museum of Iran

Animation created with the images on a pottery goblet (c. 3178 BCE) found in Shahr-e Sookhteh

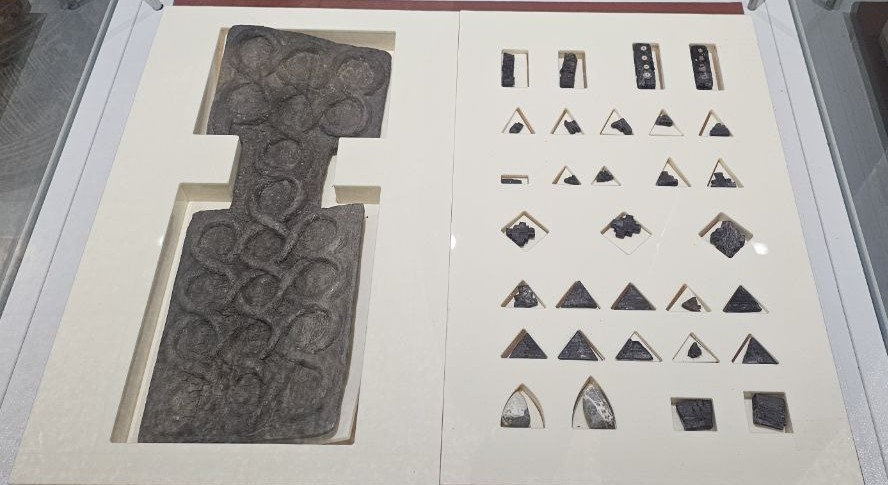
The complete set of the Shahr-i Sokhta board game with 27 pieces and 4 dice in its current condition (c. 2700 BC) National Museum of Iran

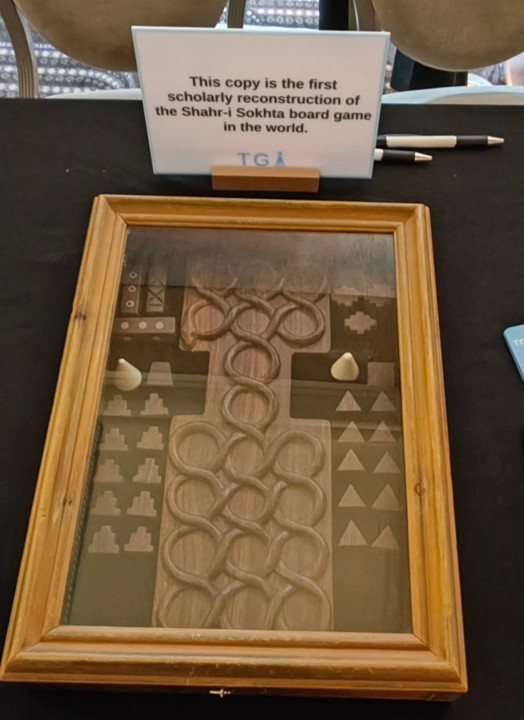
The first-ever scholarly reconstructed copy of the Shahr-i Sokhta board game by Sam Jelveh

- An earthen goblet found at the site and dated to c. 3178 BC depicts what some archaeologists consider to be the earliest known animation and the date places the artifact in Period I, the earliest period in the development and flourishing of the Shahr-e Sookhteh culture.
- The earliest known artificial eyeball was discovered in the burial of a woman at the site by archaeologists in December 2006. It has a hemispherical form and a diameter of just more than 2.5 cm (1 inch). It consists of very light material, probably bitumen paste. The surface of the artificial eye is covered with a thin layer of gold, engraved with a central circle (representing the iris) and gold lines patterned like sun rays. The woman whose remains were found with the artificial eye was 1.82 m tall (6 feet), much taller than typical women of her time. Tiny holes are drilled on both sides of the eye, through which a golden thread would have been drawn in order to hold the eyeball in place. Since microscopic research has shown that the eye socket showed clear imprints of the golden thread, the eyeball must have been worn throughout her lifetime. The woman's skeleton has been dated to between 2900 and 2800 BC.
- The oldest complete board game ever discovered with 4 different dice and 27 geometric pieces, are among the finds which have been unearthed by archaeological excavations from this site. What makes this game stand out is that it's the earliest known example of a twenty square game with a complete set. This makes it an invaluable resource for understanding the history and evolution of board games, potentially reshaping their history. For the first time, the game board was reconstructed and introduced with ancient rules, more likely to have been played during that era.
- A human skull found at the site indicates the practice of brain surgery.
- A unique marble cup was found at the site on 29 December 2014.
- A Bronze Age piece of leather adorned with drawings was discovered at the site in January 2015.
- There's some limited evidence implying matrilocality.

=== Public health finding ===
Paleoparasitological studies suggest that ancient inhabitants living in the excavated areas were infected by nematodes of the genus Physaloptera, a rare parasite incidence.

== Relationship to other early cultures ==
The Shahr-i Sokhta civilization flourished between 3200 and 2350 BC, and may have coincided with the first phase of the great flourishing Indus Valley civilization. Periods III and IV of Shahr-i Sokhta, and the last part of Mundigak Period IV are contemporary to Mature Harappan 3A and part of Mature Harappan 3B.

Shahdad is another extensive site that is being excavated and is related. Some 900 Bronze Age sites have been documented in the Sistan Basin, the desert area between Afghanistan and Pakistan.

== See also ==
- Sistan Basin
- Cities of the Ancient Near East
- Mundigak
- Proto-Elamite script
