= Helmand Civilization =

Bronze Age culture in current day Afghanistan and Iran

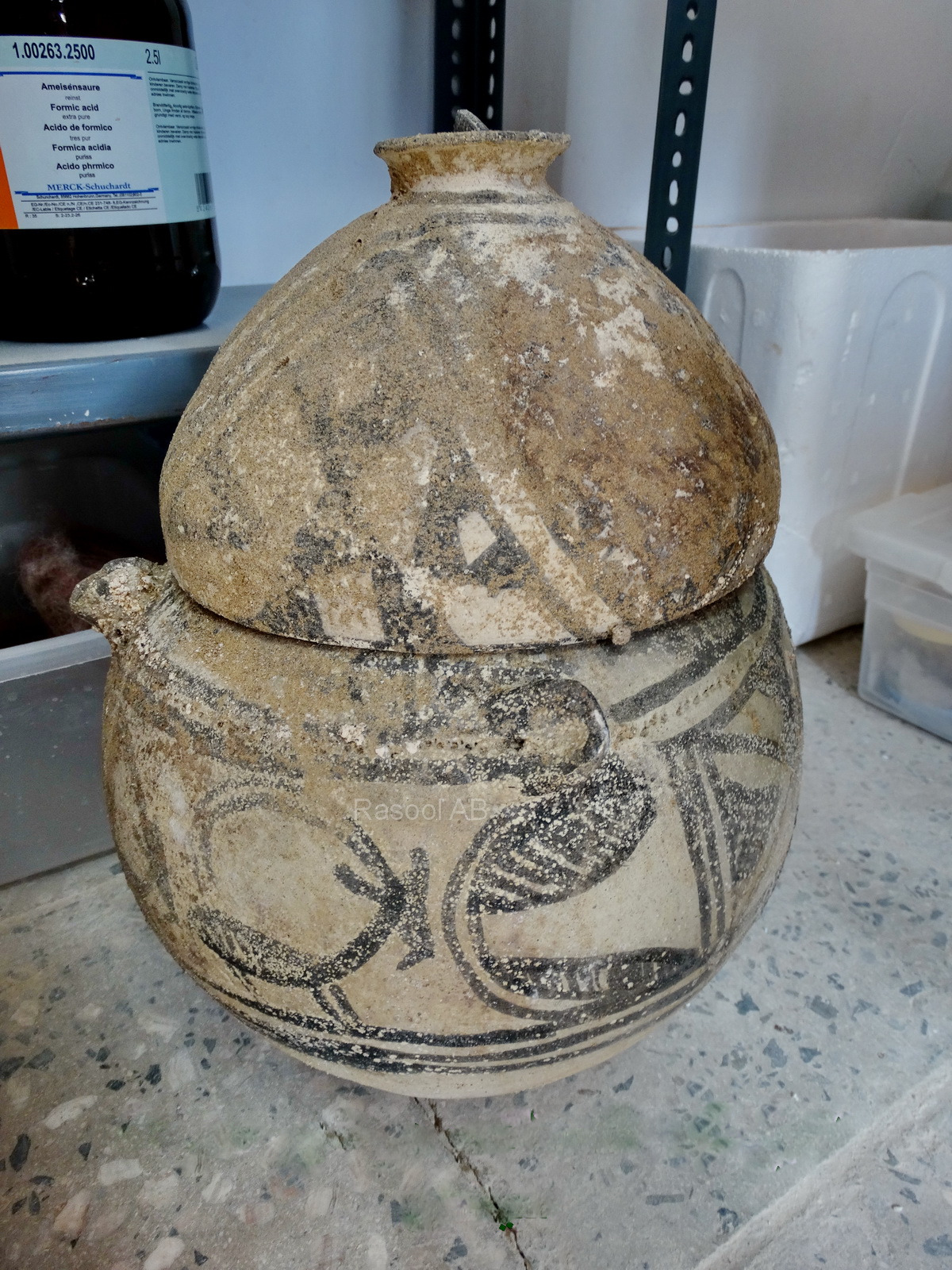
Pottery vessel from Shahr-e Sukhteh

The Helmand Civilization (sometimes Helmand culture), c. 3300–2350 BCE, was a Bronze Age civilization that flourished mainly in the middle and lower valley of the Helmand River, originally in eastern Iran (Zabol, other name: Sistan in Sistan and Baluchestan Province) and southern Afghanistan (Kandahar, Helmand and Nimruz provinces), predominantly in the third millennium BCE.

The people of the Helmand civilization lived partly in cities with temples and palaces, providing evidence for a complex and advanced social structure. The main cities so far known are Shahr-i Sokhta (in Zabol, Iran) and Mundigak (in modern Afghanistan). Research on the finds from both places showed that these cities shared the same culture. These are the earliest discovered cities in this part of the world, although the village Mehrgarh further to the southeast is considerably older. It is possible that the Helmand culture once formed one ancient state.

The pottery of the Helmand civilization is colorfully painted with mainly geometrical patterns. Plants and animals are also depicted. In Shahr-i Sokhta, texts were found in the Elamite language providing evidence of connections to the west of the Iran. There are also a few connections with the Indus Valley Civilisation, but it seems that the Helmand civilization existed earlier and did not have significant chronological overlap with the cities in the Indus valley.

V. M. Masson discussed several types of early civilizations. He distinguishes three typesː 1. Civilizations of tropical agriculture; 2. Civilizations of irrigation agriculture; and 3. civilizations of non-irrigated Mediterranean agriculture. For the civilizations of irrigation agriculture he sees two sub typesː Civilizations with irrigation derived from large rivers and civilizations with irrigation agriculture based on limited water sources. According to Masson, the Helmand culture clearly belongs to the latter type. He does not mention the term Helmand culture, but the cities Mundigak and Shahr-i Sokhta.

== Geography and Archaeology ==
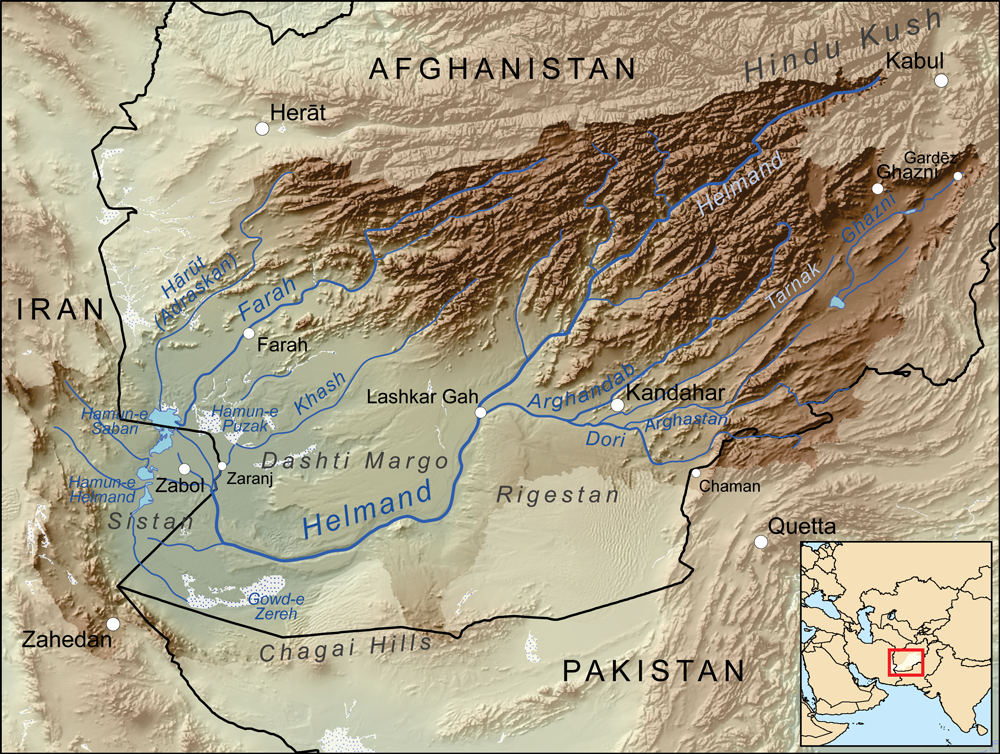
Helmand River

The formative phase of Helmand civilization was in the middle and lower Helmand river, which flows c. 1300 km southwestwards, crossing the deserts of Registan and Margo, reaching Iranian Sistan. The two most known sites are Mundigak, 35 km northwest of Kandahar, in Afghanistan, and Shahr-i Sokhta, 425 km distant, 50 km south-southwest of Zabol in Iran. Lamberg-Karlovsky and Tosi (1973) considered important the uniformity of finds in Shahr-i Sokhta and Mundigak shown in thousands of potsherds, lithic industry, metal working, building techniques, brick shapes, figurines and seals at the end of 4th millennium BCE. And although the Afghan region between both main sites bears no archaeological centers identified, there are two pottery production hubs, Tepe Dash and Rud-i Biyaban 2, both to the south of Shahr-i Sokhta; and Deh Morasi Ghundai and Said Qala Tepe to the southeast of Mundigak.

Significant archaeological similarities have been found also in Quetta Valley at Damb Sadaat, and in the Kachi Plain in Pakistan, around 200 km and over 300 km to the southeast of Kandahar respectively.

== Chronology ==
The site of Mundigak presents four periods of occupation from first times to urban development:

Period	Chronology	Phase
I	(~4000–3800 BCE)	Ph. 1–2
I	(~3800–3400 BCE)	Ph. 3–4
II	(~3400–3200 BCE)	
III	(~3200–2900 BCE)	
IV	(~2900–2400 BCE)	

Archaeologists Jarrige, Didier, and Quivron considered that Periods III and IV in Mundigak have archaeological links with Periods I, II, and III in Shahr-i Sokhta.

On the other hand, based on recently calibrated radiocarbon samples in the site Tappeh Graziani, very close to Shahr-i Sokhta, Italian and Iranian archaeologists showed that the site was abandoned around 2350 BCE, and the chronology of Shahr-i Sokhta commented by archaeologist Massimo Vidale is as follows:

Period	Dating	Settlement size
I	3200–2800 BCE	10.5–15.5 ha
II	2800–2600	80 ha
III	2600–2450	80 ha
IV	2450–2350	

Iranian archaeologists S.M.S. Sajjadi and Hossein Moradi, during excavation season (2014–2015) in area 26 of Shahr-i Sokhta's Period IV, found a system of latrines in a long passage between two buildings, and Massimo Vidale considers it is part of a "fully palatial" compound with very similar semi-columns to those in Mehrgarh found years ago by the French mission that dated them around 2500 BCE.
