= 3rd Battalion, 8th Marines =

US infantry unit (1940–46; 1951-2021)

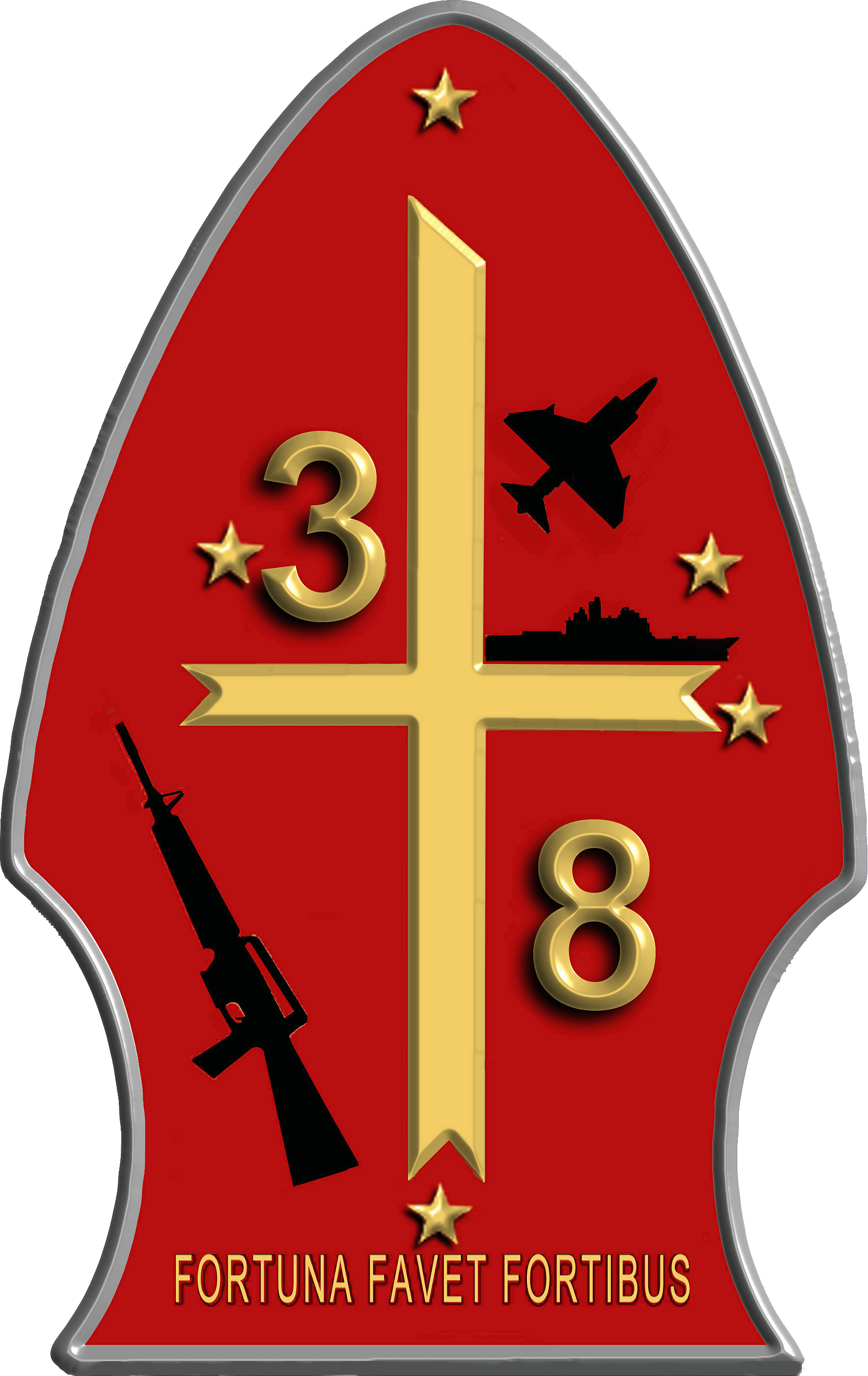
- 3rd Battalion 8th Marines Unit insignia
- Active: November 1, 1940 – March 26, 1946; January 15, 1951 – May 18, 2021
- Country: United States
- Branch: United States Marine Corps
- Type: Light infantry
- Role: Locate, close with and destroy the enemy by fire and maneuver
- Part of: 8th Marine Regiment; 2nd Marine Division
- Garrison/HQ: Marine Corps Base Camp Lejeune
- Mottos: "Fortuna Favet Fortibus" "Fortune Favors the Strong"
- Engagements: World War II; Battle of Guadalcanal; Battle of Tarawa; Battle of Saipan; Battle of Tinian; Battle of Okinawa; Cold War; Multinational Force in Lebanon; Kosovo War; Operation Allied Force; Operation Noble Anvil; Operation Allied Harbor; Operation Shining Hope; Operation Joint Guardian; Operation Eastern Access; Operation Secure Tomorrow; Global war on terrorism; War in Afghanistan; Iraq War

Commanders
- Notable commanders: John C. Miller Jr. David H. Berger; Robert R. Blackman Jr.

3rd Battalion, 8th Marines (3/8) was an infantry battalion in the United States Marine Corps based out of Marine Corps Base Camp Lejeune, North Carolina, was consisted of approximately 1,100 Marines and sailors. The battalion fell under the command of the 8th Marine Regiment and the 2nd Marine Division.

== Subordinate units ==
- Headquarters and Service Company
- Company I
- Company K
- Company L
- Weapons Company

== Mission ==
The mission of the Marine Corps rifle squad is to locate, close with and destroy the enemy by fire and maneuver and/ or repel enemy assault by fire and close combat.

== History ==
=== World War II ===
The battalion was activated on November 1, 1940, in San Diego and was assigned to the 2nd Marine Brigade. The 2nd Marine Brigade was re-designated February 1, 1941, as 2nd Marine Division. It participated in the action at the Battle of Guadalcanal, Battle of Tarawa, Battle of Saipan, Battle of Tinian and the Battle of Okinawa. Following the surrender of Japan, they re-deployed during September 1945 to Nagasaki, Japan and participated in occupation of Japan from until February 1946. The battalion was deactivated March 26, 1946.

=== Cold War ===
==== 1950s & 1960s ====
3/8 was reactivated on January 15, 1951, at Camp Lejeune, North Carolina, as 3rd and was assigned to the 2nd Marine Division. During the 1960s they participated in the Cuban Missile Crisis from October to December 1962 and Operation Powerpack in the Dominican Republic in 1965.

==== 1970s ====
3/8 went to the Med in January 1979 as part of the 32 MAU. Major Oliver North was 3/8’s S3 officer.

==== 1980s ====
3/8 went to the Mediterranean Sea in January 1980 and 1981 as part of the 32 MAU. One of their company first sergeants, Lewis G. Lee, would eventually become Sergeant Major of the Marine Corps.

The battalion was part of the Multi-Nation Peace Keeping Force in Lebanon from October 1982 to February 1983, and February through October 1984.

=== 1990s ===
- Participated in Operation Sharp Edge in Liberia during August 1990.
- Participated in Operation Provide Comfort in northern Iraq during April and July 1991.
- Participated in Operation Deny Flight, Bosnia and Herzegovina, March- September 1993.
- Participated in Operation Deny Flight, Bosnia, April - September 1995.
- Participated in Operation Assured Response, Liberia, June - August 1996.
- Element Participated in Operation Quick Response, Central African Republic, June 1996.
- Participated in Operation Joint Endeavor Adriatic Sea October 1996.
- Elements participated in security operations Haiti and Panama November 1997 – February 1998 and January – August 1999.
- Participated in Operation Noble Anvil, Operation Shining Hope and Operation Joint Guardian, April 1999 to October 1999.
- Participated in Operation Avid Response, U.S. relief efforts to Turkey after the 1999 Izmit earthquake, August 1999.

=== Global war on terrorism ===
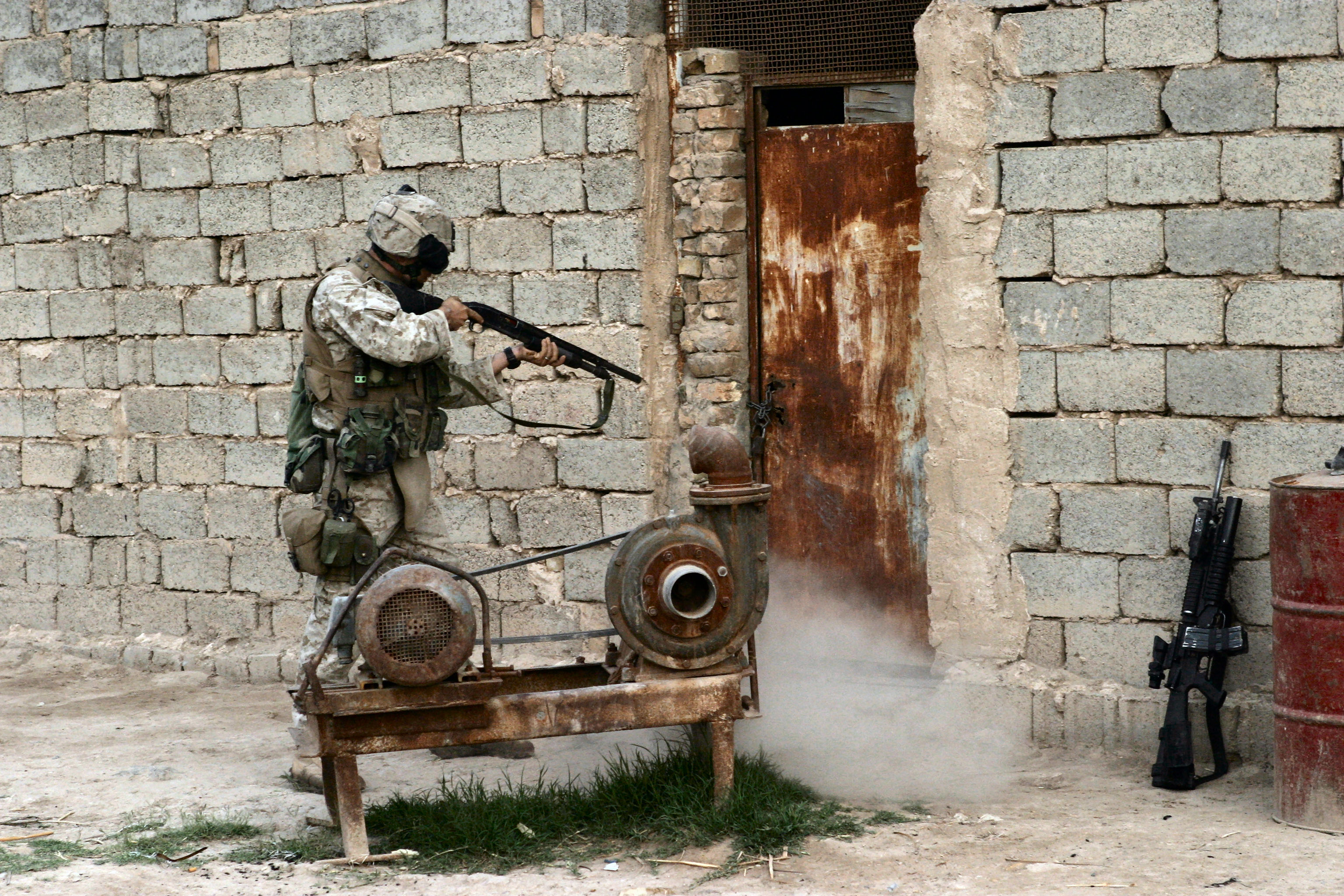
Marine from 3/8 breaching a door in 2005.

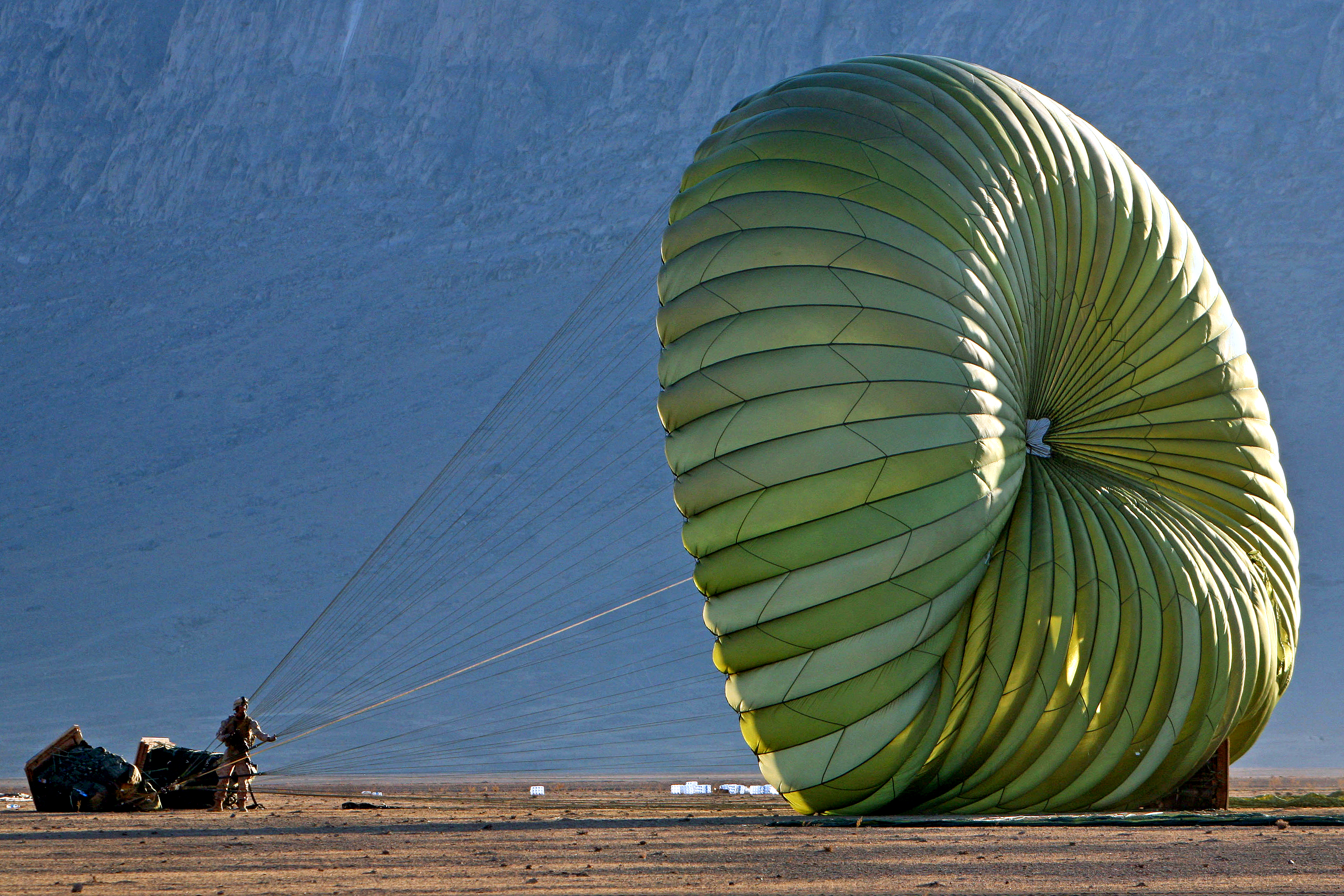
A Marine from Company I, 3/8, holds onto a parachute attached to a supply of water and food dropped by CLB-3 Marines from a C-130 cargo transport aircraft during Operation Backstop in Helmand province, Afghanistan, December 11, 2008.

- Participated in Operation Enduring Freedom, Kabul, Afghanistan, December 2001 - September 2002. During this time companies from 3rd Battalion, 8th Marines guarded the U.S. Embassy in Kabul, Afghanistan.
- Participated in Operation Secure Tomorrow, Port au Prince, Haiti, March - June 2004.
- Participated in Operation Iraqi Freedom, Karmah, Iraq, January - August 2005.
- Participated in Operation Iraqi Freedom, Ramadi, Iraq, March - mid October 2006
- Served as the ground combat element of the 22nd Marine Expeditionary Unit from February 2007 - February 2008, during which elements participated in Operation Sea Angel II in Bangladesh.
- Participated in Operation Enduring Freedom, Afghanistan October 2008 - June 2009. In December 2008, the Marines of India Company provided security for Operation Backstop — protecting large British logistics convoy that moved equipment and supplies for Coalition combat operations in Helmand Province. Mainly Nawzad, Afghanistan.
- Served as the ground combat element of the 26th Marine Expeditionary Unit from April 2010 - May 2011, during which elements were deployed into Afghanistan from January–May 2011 in the Nahri Saraj District of Helmand province.
- Elements participated in Odyssey Dawn and Unified Protector while deployed aboard 26 MEU
- Participated in Operation Enduring Freedom, Marjah, Afghanistan, April 2012 to December 2012.

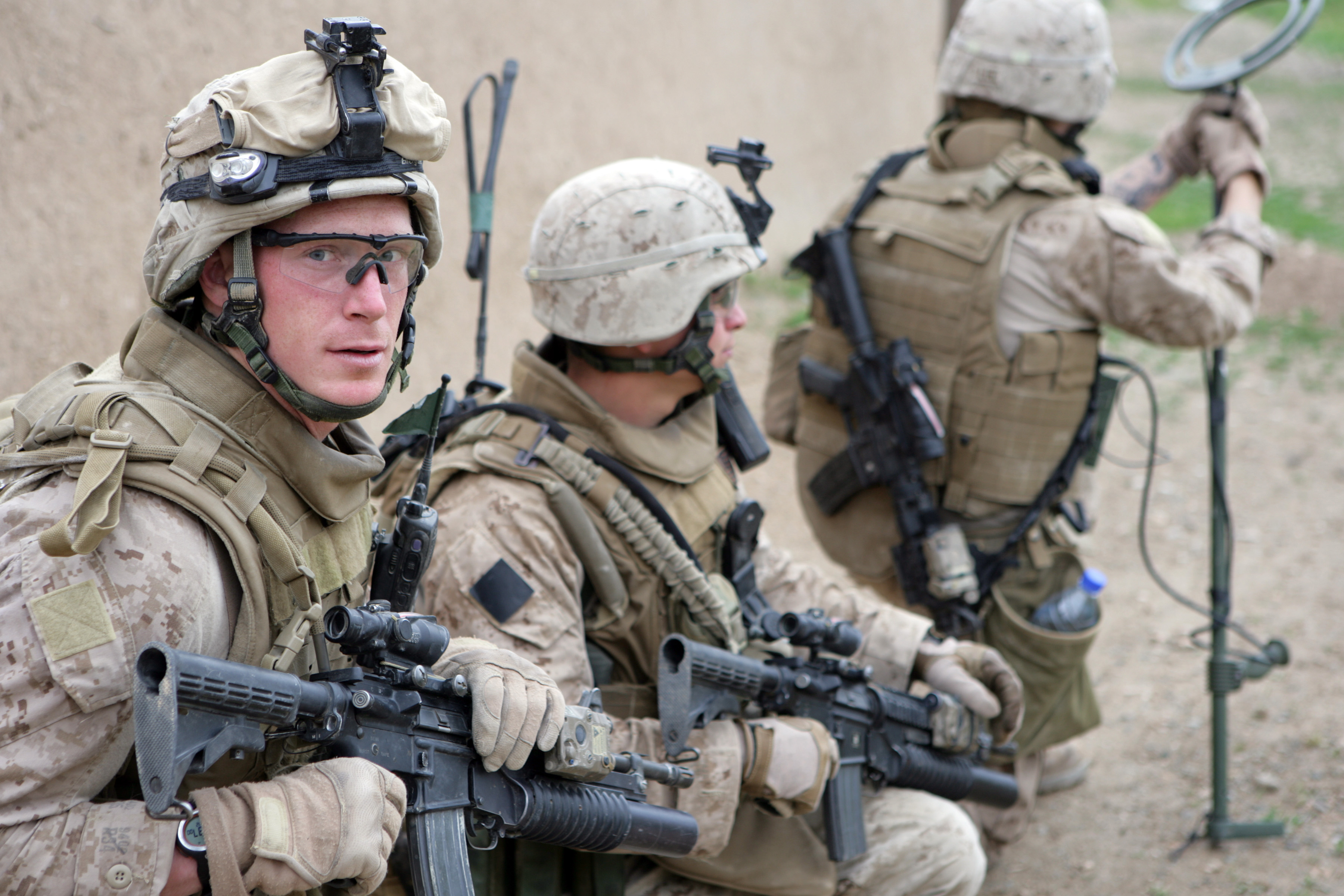
3rd Battalion, 8th Marine Regiment conduct a local security patrol in the abandoned village, Afghanistan, on April 12, 2009

=== Deactivation ===
Commandant Gen. David H. Berger, former Commanding Officer of 3rd Battalion, 8th Marines, released a press statement stating,"Developing a force that incorporates emerging technologies and a significant change to force structure within our current resource constraints will require the Marine Corps to become smaller and remove legacy capabilities". In May 2020, 3rd Battalion was listed as one of the units proposed to be deactivated. U.S. Marine Corps Col. John H. Rochford, the commanding officer of 8th Marine Regiment, and Sgt. Maj. Keith D. Hoge, the sergeant major of 8th Marine Reg., both with the 2nd Marine Division, cased the regimental colors during a deactivation ceremony on Camp Lejeune, North Carolina on January 28, 2021.

=== Awards ===
- Presidential Unit Citation Streamer with 2 bronze stars
- Joint Meritorious Unit Award Streamer
- Navy Unit Commendation Streamer with 1 silver and 2 bronze stars
- Meritorious Unit Commendation Sreamer with 2 bronze stars
- Marine Corps Expeditionary Streamer with 2 bronze stars
- American Defense Service Medal Streamer
- Asiatic-Pacific Campaign Streamer with 1 silver star
- World War II Victory Streamer
- Navy Occupation Service Streamer with "Asia" and "Europe"

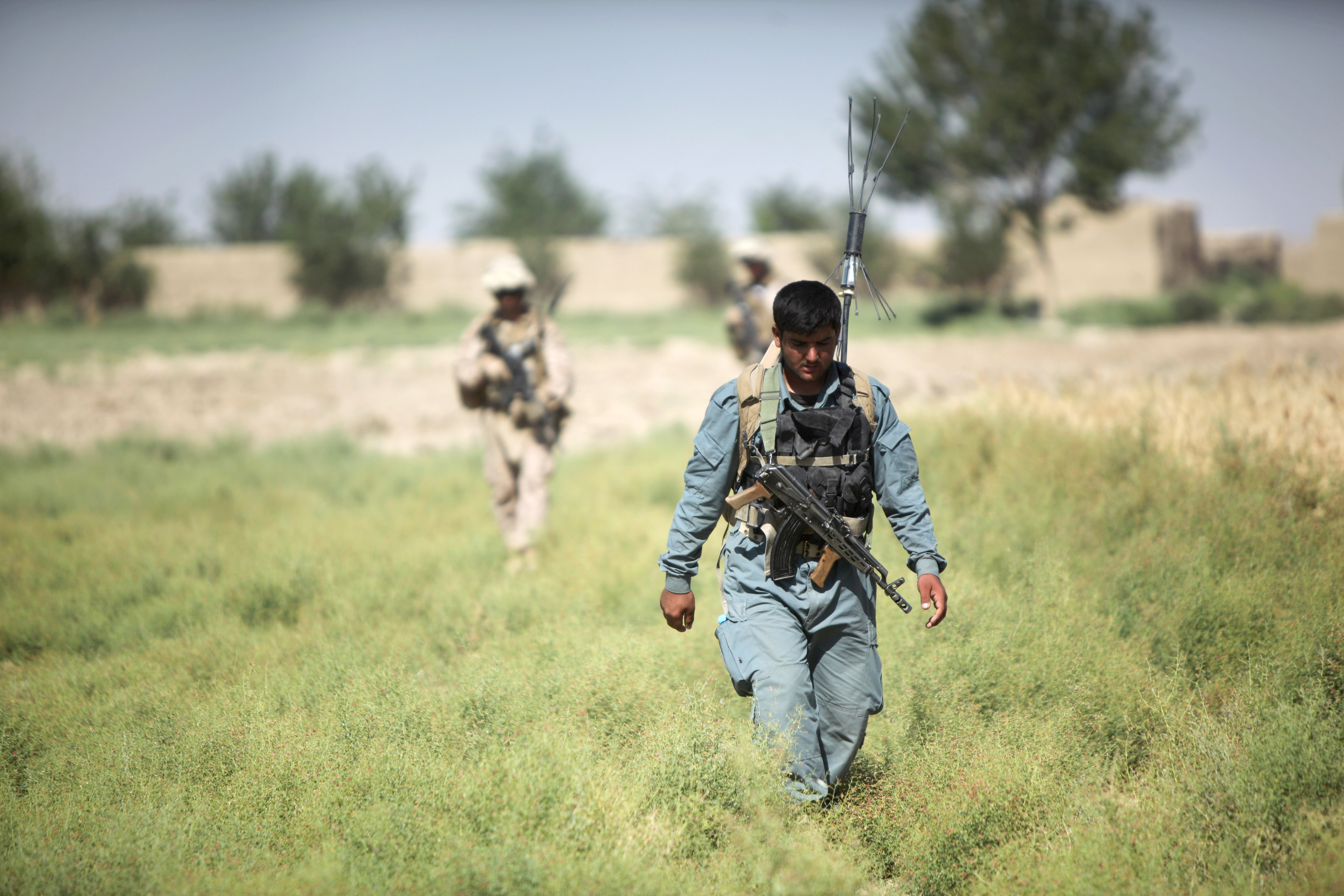
Kilo Company, 3rd Battalion, 8th Marine Regiment, partnered with Afghan National Police, patrol through Garmsir District, Helmand province, Afghanistan, June 1, 2012

- National Defense Service Streamer with 3 bronze stars
- Armed Forces Expeditionary Streamer with 1 bronze star
- Southwest Asia Service Streamer with 1 bronze star
- Kosovo Campaign Streamer with 2 bronze stars
- Afghanistan Campaign Streamer with 3 bronze stars
- Iraqi Campaign Streamer with 1 bronze star
- Global War on Terrorism Expeditionary Streamer
- Global War on Terrorism Service Streamer

== See also ==
- List of United States Marine Corps battalions
- Organization of the United States Marine Corps
