= Michael Myatt =

United States Marine Corps general

James Michael Myatt
- Major General James M. Myatt
- Born: 1940 (age 85–86); Saint Francis Memorial Hospital, San Francisco, California, U.S.
- Spouse(s): Wendy Lee (current), Jill Bell Myatt
- Children: Jamy Myatt, Julie Marie Myatt, Eamon Myatt, Christopher Lee, Jeffrey Lee
- Military career
- Allegiance: United States
- Branch: United States Marine Corps
- Service years: 1963 to 1995
- Rank: Major general
- Commands: 1st Marine Division, 26th Marine Expeditionary Unit, Special Operations Training Group
- Awards: Silver Star, Bronze Star, Defense Superior Service Medal

James Michael Myatt is a retired United States Marine Corps major general. His assignments included leading the 1st Marine Division in Camp Pendleton, California from (August 1990–July 1992), the 26th Marine Amphibious Unit in 1985 and was also the commander for the Special Operations Training Group from 1987 to 1988. After retiring from the Marine Corps in 1995, he worked for Bechtel Corporations to lead a construction project on high-speed rail in Korea, and served as president of the Marines' Memorial Club from September 2001 until 2017. He is married to Wendy Lee, senior vice president of Digital Health Technology and Strategic Initiatives, Kaiser Permanente.

== Early life ==
Major General Mike Myatt was born in 1940 at Saint Francis Memorial Hospital, San Francisco, California. His father worked for an insurance company and traveled around the world. Myatt spent his childhood living in Denver and Littleton, Colorado. By the age of 17, Myatt and his family had moved to several different cities in Texas and New Mexico including Albuquerque, Amarillo, and Houston.

Myatt went to college at Sam Houston State University in Huntsville, Texas, while his family lived in Jackson, Mississippi. In 1960, Myatt became a part of the Caballero Club, which later became a chapter of Sigma Chi. He served as the rush chairman and interfraternity Council representative. In addition, he honed his leadership skills as President of his fraternity and Vice President of his SHSU Class in 1961, he earned his B.S. degree in physics. While at Sam Houston State, he also met a Marine Captain who recruited him into the Platoon Leaders Class program (P.L.C.). Myatt graduated from the Platoon Leaders Class in May 1963 and was commissioned as a 2nd Lieutenant in the United States Marine Corps.

== Family ==
Maj. Gen. Myatt's family is an essential element in his life. His first marriage was to Jill Bell Myatt, who raised their two daughters, Jamy Myatt and Julie Marie Myatt. Jamy is a teacher in Life Skills at the Crossroads School in Santa Monica, California and is raising her son Eamon Myatt, Maj. Gen. Myatt's grandson. Julie is a professor at Northwestern University teaching playwriting and is the author of some of Maj. Gen. Myatt's favorite plays. Wendy Lee is Maj. Gen. Myatt's current bride and has two sons named Christopher Lee and Jeffrey Lee, who are both married. Christopher has a son and daughter named Ryan and Juliet. Jeffrey has a son named Jonathan.

== Marine Corps career ==
After being commissioned as a 2nd Lieutenant, Myatt attended The Basic School (TBS) in Quantico, Virginia, for six months training as a new Marine officer in leadership, esprit-de-corps, and warfighting tactics expected of a rifle platoon commander. These skills prepared Myatt for the responsibilities and duties of an infantry platoon commander in the operating forces.

In January 1964, 2nd Lieutenant Myatt was assigned to the 1st Marine Brigade, with the 1st Battalion 4th Marines in Kaneohe Bay, Hawaii. Instead of partaking in Operation Silver Lance, 2nd Lieutenant Myatt and his platoon were deployed to Okinawa, Japan, from where they deployed to Vietnam. On May 7, 1965, Lieutenant Myatt and his platoon landed on the beaches of Chu Lai, Vietnam. He led his men in and around Chu Lai until December 1966 when his battalion was moved south of Hue City in January 1966 during the time President Lyndon Johnson was increasing involvement in Vietnam.

In addition to Lieutenant Myatt's service in Vietnam, he was awarded the Silver Star in his combat operations against Viet Cong insurgents. During Operation Oregon on March 20, 1966, Lieutenant Myatt successfully maneuvered his platoon through the rice paddies, where he coordinated an offensive with his squads to advance on the enemy's position. Lieutenant Myatt led his platoon from the front and continued to direct his platoon's fire on the enemy's position. Lieutenant Myatt withdrew his platoon and coordinated a fire mission with an artillery battery, which destroyed the enemy's position.

After Myatt graduated and earned his master's degree at the Naval Postgraduate School, he returned to Vietnam in July 1969. Myatt was the commander of the Technical Liaison Team responsible for utilizing ground sensors, both systematic and acoustic in Vietnam. In March 1970, Myatt became the Senior Marine Advisor for the Republic of Vietnam Marine Division.

In January 1971, Myatt was assigned to teach systems engineering at the U.S. Naval Academy in Annapolis, Maryland. While at the Naval Academy, Myatt started the parachute club and was an advisor to the cross-country team. In June 1973, Myatt was assigned to the 3rd Battalion 2nd Marines, 2nd Marine Division, as the executive officer. He was later assigned as the Division Staff Secretary. Myatt was later sent to the 4th Marine Amphibious Brigade, commanded by then Brigadier General Alfred M. Gray, who later became the 29th Commandant of the Marine Corps.

After Myatt served with the 4th Marine Amphibious Brigade, in 1979, he was sent to the Defense Language Institute to learn Norwegian and was the first Marine to attend the Norwegian National Defense College in Oslo, Norway. In 1981, he was assigned back to Headquarters Marine Corps as the Plans Officer with the Plans Division and then served on the staff of the chairman of the Joint Chiefs of Staff. In July 1985, Myatt took command of the 26th Marine Amphibious Unit which participated in two deployments to the Mediterranean, which became the Marine Corps’ first Special Operations capable unit. He was later in charge of the Special Operations Training Group from 1987 to 1988 and received his first star as a brigadier general in June 1988.

In August 1990, General Myatt assumed command of the 1st Marine Division on Marine Corps Base, Camp Pendleton, California. Immediately, as General Myatt was assigned commanding general, he deployed his division to Saudi Arabia, where he led his Marines through Operations Desert Shield and Operation Desert Storm. Myatt was promoted to major general in January 1991. His division defeated seven divisions of the Iraqi Army, recaptured the Kuwait International Airport and liberated Kuwait City. Some of the more well known Marine Generals today served under General Myatt, such as General John Kelly, General Joseph Dunford, and Secretary of Defense James Mattis.

== Civilian career ==
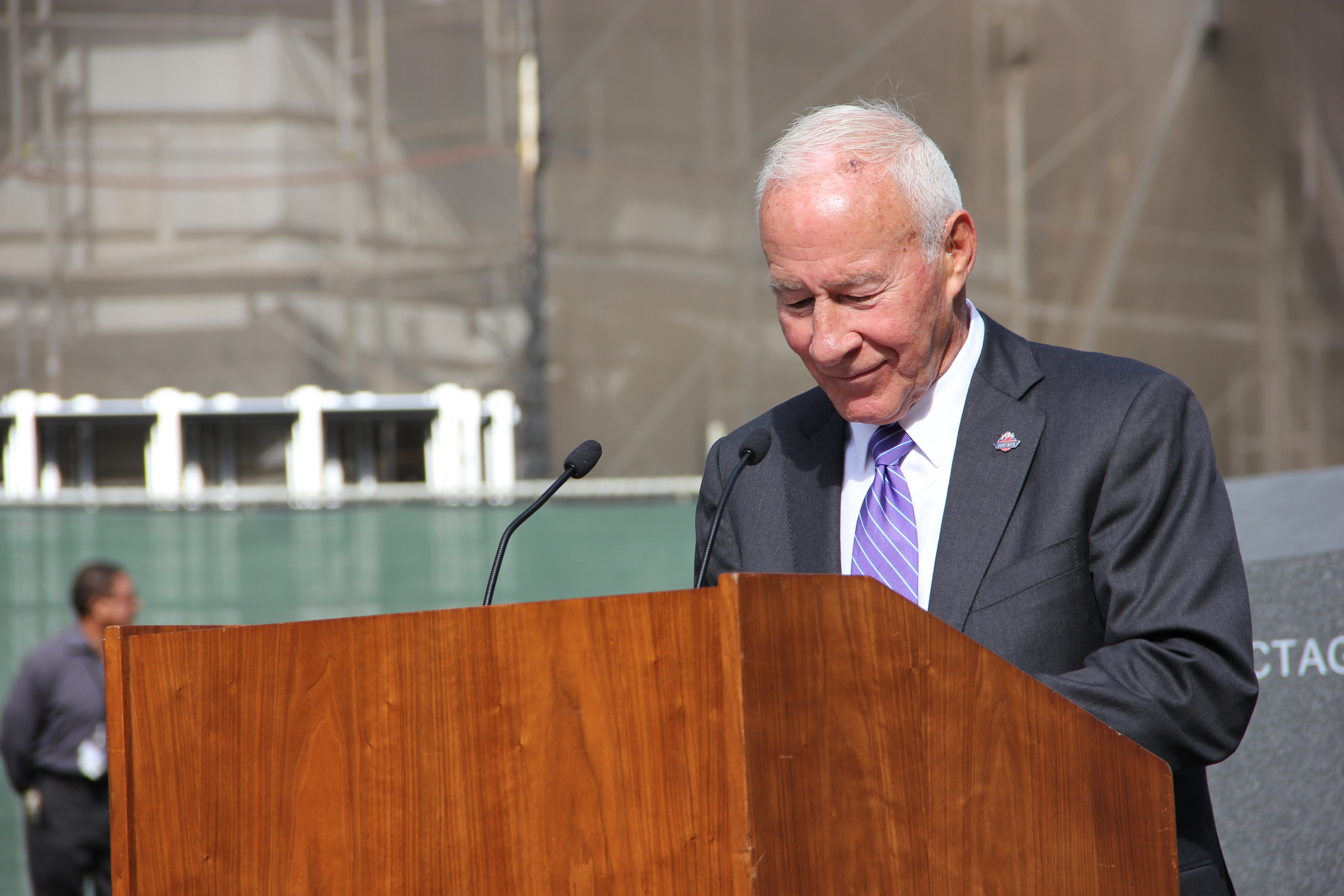
Myatt speaks at the San Francisco Veterans Memorial dedication ceremony in 2014

Prior to General Myatt's retirement from the Marine Corps, he was assigned to the Combined Forces Command in Seoul, Korea. From August 1992 to 1994, he was assigned to the Navy's staff as director of expeditionary warfare. After Myatt retired from the Marine Corps in August 1995, he worked for Bechtel Corporation. Myatt moved back to San Francisco, California, and started working for Bechtel in August 1995. From January 1998 to December 1999, he led Bechtel's major construction project of the Korean high-speed rail system from Seoul to Busan.

After Myatt left Bechtel Corporation, he was nominated to become the president and CEO of the Marines' Memorial Club in San Francisco, California. Myatt assumed his position on September 10, 2001, just prior to the September 11 attack. With the help of the San Francisco's Bay Area Blue Star Mothers of America, and the Marines' Memorial Club, he organized the fourteenth American Gold Star Mothers Honor and Remembrance gathering, which was recognized by CBS' 60 minutes in 2016. Myatt held his position as CEO for 16 years and retired in 2017. He helped construct a mutual relationship between the city of San Francisco and the military. Since 2010, at the request of the San Francisco Mayor's office, General Myatt has orchestrated and executed very successful San Francisco's annual Fleet Week events every October.

== Awards and decorations ==
U.S. military decorations
Navy Distinguished Service Medal
Silver Star Medal
Defense Superior Service Medal
Legion of Merit
Bronze Star Medal with Combat Distinguishing Device
Meritorious Service Medal with gold award star
Joint Service Commendation Medal
Combat Action Ribbon
U.S. Unit Awards
Presidential Unit Citation
Navy Unit Commendation with two bronze service stars
Navy Meritorious Unit Commendation
U.S. Service (Campaign) Medals and Service and Training Ribbons
National Defense Service Medal with bronze service star
Vietnam Service Medal with silver and bronze service star
Southwest Asia Service Medal with two bronze campaign stars
Sea Service Deployment Ribbon with three bronze service stars
Overseas Service Ribbon
Vietnam Armed Forces Honor Medal ribbon - Second Class
Vietnam Gallantry Cross
Vietnam Civil Actions Medal
Vietnam Campaign Medal
Kuwait Liberation Medal (Saudi Arabia)

U.S. badges, patches and tabs
Navy and Marine Corps Parachutist Insignia
Rifle Expert Badge
Pistol Expert Badge

== Bibliography ==
- "James Myatt – Recipient." The Hall of Valor Project, https://valor.militarytimes.com/hero/40862.
- Nolte, Carl. "Retired Career Marine a Vital Link between SF, Military." SFChronicle.com, San Francisco Chronicle, 11 Nov. 2017, https://www.sfchronicle.com/bayarea/nativeson/article/Retired-career-Marine-a-vital-link-between-SF-12349314.php.
- Whiting, Sam. "A Hero Digs Deep into His Footlocker and into Memories of War." SFChronicle.com, San Francisco Chronicle, 24 May 2015, https://www.sfchronicle.com/bayarea/article/A-hero-digs-deep-into-his-footlocker-and-6281471.php?t=a182ebb620.
