= 26th Marine Expeditionary Unit =

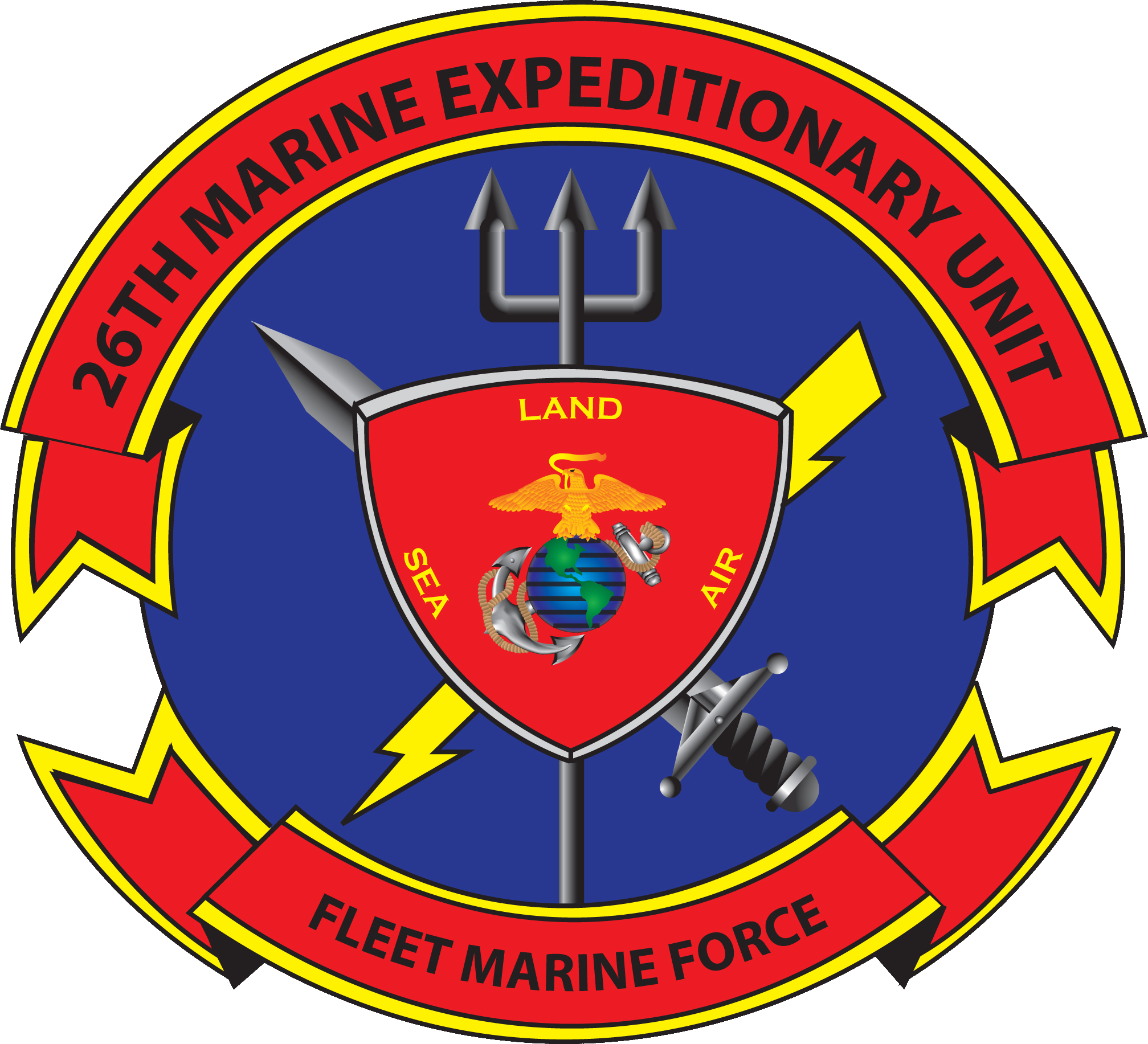
- Founded: April 24, 1967 (59 years)
- Country: United States
- Branch: United States Marine Corps
- Type: Special operations capable air-ground task force
- Role: Crisis response force
- Size: 2,400
- Part of: II Marine Expeditionary Force
- Garrison/HQ: Marine Corps Base Camp Lejeune
- Motto: "A Certain Force in an Uncertain World"
- Mascot: Proteus
- Engagements: Persian Gulf War; Operation Desert Shield; Operation Sharp Edge; Yugoslav Wars; Operation Provide Promise; Operation Deny Flight; Operation Noble Anvil; Zhegër incident; Operation Silver Wake; Global War on Terrorism; Operation Enduring Freedom; War in Afghanistan; Iraq War; 2003 invasion of Iraq; Operation Inherent Resolve; Libyan Civil War; Operation Odyssey Dawn
- Website: 26thmeu.marines.mil

Commanders
- Commanding Officers: Col. Michael Stansberry
- Executive Officer: LtCol. Eric K. Nilsson
- Sergeant Major: SgtMaj Christopher Taylor

The 26th Marine Expeditionary Unit (26th MEU) is one of seven such marine expeditionary units (MEUs) currently in existence in the United States Marine Corps. It is an air-ground task force with a strength of about 2,400 personnel when at full strength during a deployment. It consists of four major parts: a command element, a ground combat element, an aviation combat element, and a logistics combat element. Since its establishment in the early 1970s as the 26th Marine Amphibious Unit, it has deployed extensively and participated in numerous combat and contingency operations, as well as training exercises. The 26th MEU is based out of Marine Corps Base Camp Lejeune in the U.S. state of North Carolina.

== History ==
=== Early years ===
The 26th Marine Expeditionary Unit was established on 24 April 1967 for a short mission and was quickly deactivated (as was the norm during this period) on 20 October 1967. During June–December 1969, the 26th MEU was reactivated as the 36th Marine Expeditionary Unit for Exercise Landing Force Caribbean 3-69 (LANFORCARIB 3-69).

In 1975 the 36th Marine Amphibious Unit participated in Exercise Straffe Zügel 75, part of Exercise Reforger, conducted in the central plains of West Germany near the city of Hanover. The 36th MAU's participation marked the first time since World War I the Marine Corps had a combined arms force ashore in Germany. The unit was redesignated as the 26th Marine Amphibious Unit in 1982 and became part of the rotation cycle of three MAUs on the East Coast in 1985. It was the first of the MAUs to undergo Special Operations Capable training, earn the SOC qualification, and have AV-8B Harriers attached. The SOC designation denotes a MEU has undergone an enhanced pre-deployment training program and is able to provide special operations capabilities during an upcoming deployment. In 1986, the MEU participated in Operation El Dorado Canyon. The unit was again redesignated as the 26th Marine Expeditionary Unit in 1988.

=== 1990s through 2000 ===
In 1991 the 26TH MEU supported Operation Desert Shield by providing a "Show of Force" in the Mediterranean, and participated in Operation Sharp Edge, a non-combatant evacuation operation of Liberia. The next year saw the 26th MEU participating in Operation Provide Promise, Operation Deny Flight and Operation Sharp Guard off the coast of Yugoslavia.

In 1994 the 26th MEU participated in ceremonies marking the 50th Anniversary of the D-Day invasion of Normandy, France. The 26th MEU also supported Operation Restore Hope off the coast of Somalia and participated in continued operations in Bosnia.

Three years later the 26th MEU launched Operation Silver Wake, evacuating U.S. citizens and foreign nationals from Albania, and also participated in Operation Guardian Retrieval, the staging of forces in the Congo for a possible evacuation of Zaire.

In 1998 the 26th MEU served as the Headquarters for the Strategic Reserve Force during Exercise Dynamic Response in Bosnia. The SRF is a multinational force made up of forces from the Netherlands, Spain, Italy, Romania, Poland, and the United States.

The 26th MEU played a notable role in the Balkan conflict. In 1998 it participated in Operation Determined Falcon, the one-day NATO aerial show-of-force in Kosovo. From April to May 1999 it took part in Operation Noble Anvil and Operation Shining Hope. While supporting Noble Anvil, NATO's bombing campaign in Kosovo, with AV-8B Harrier attack aircraft, the 26th ME also provided security for Kosovar refugees at Camps Hope and Eagle in Albania. From June to July 1999, it participated in Operation Joint Guardian. As the first U.S. peacekeepers in Kosovo, the 26th MEU helped provide stability to the embattled region.

August 1999 saw the 26th MEU taking part in Operation Avid Response, providing Humanitarian Assistance to the people of Western Turkey left homeless by a devastating earthquake.

The 26th MEU conducted Adriatic presence operations during the election crisis in the Federal Republic of Yugoslavia, in September 2000. The 26th MEU also participated in exercises Atlas Hinge in Tunisia and Croatian Phibex 2000, the first-ever bilateral exercise between the Marine Corps and the Croatian Armed Forces. During the next two months, the 26th MEU supported diplomatic initiatives during unrest in Israel while simultaneously taking part in the NATO exercise Destined Glory 2000 and continued to break new ground through the second bi-lateral exercise between the Marine Corps and the Croatian Armed Forces, exercise Slunj 2000.

=== Global war on terrorism ===
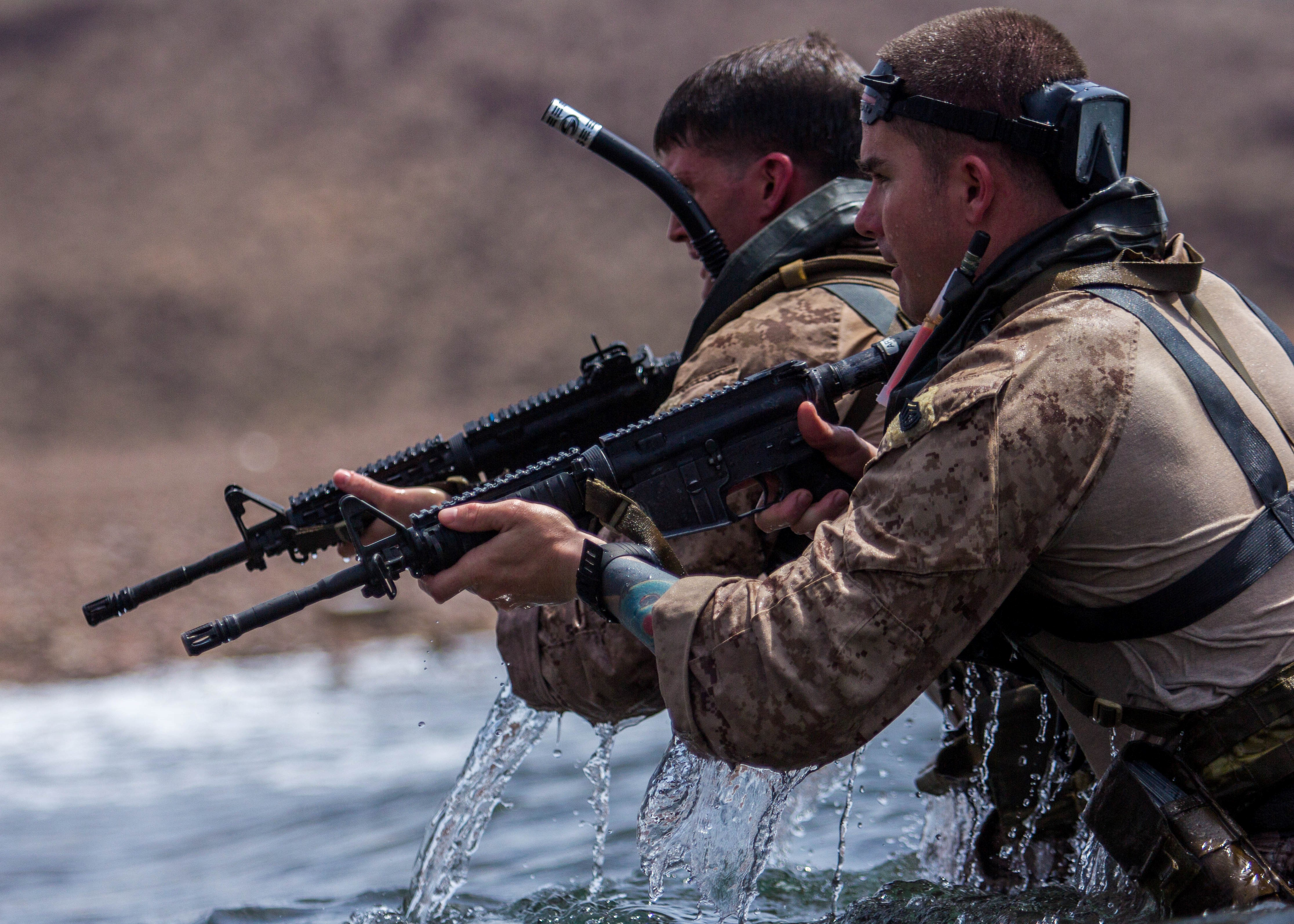
26th Marine Expeditionary Unit (MEU) Maritime Raid Force members conduct an amphibious insertion during sustainment training in the U.S. 6th Fleet area of responsibility, 3 August 2013.

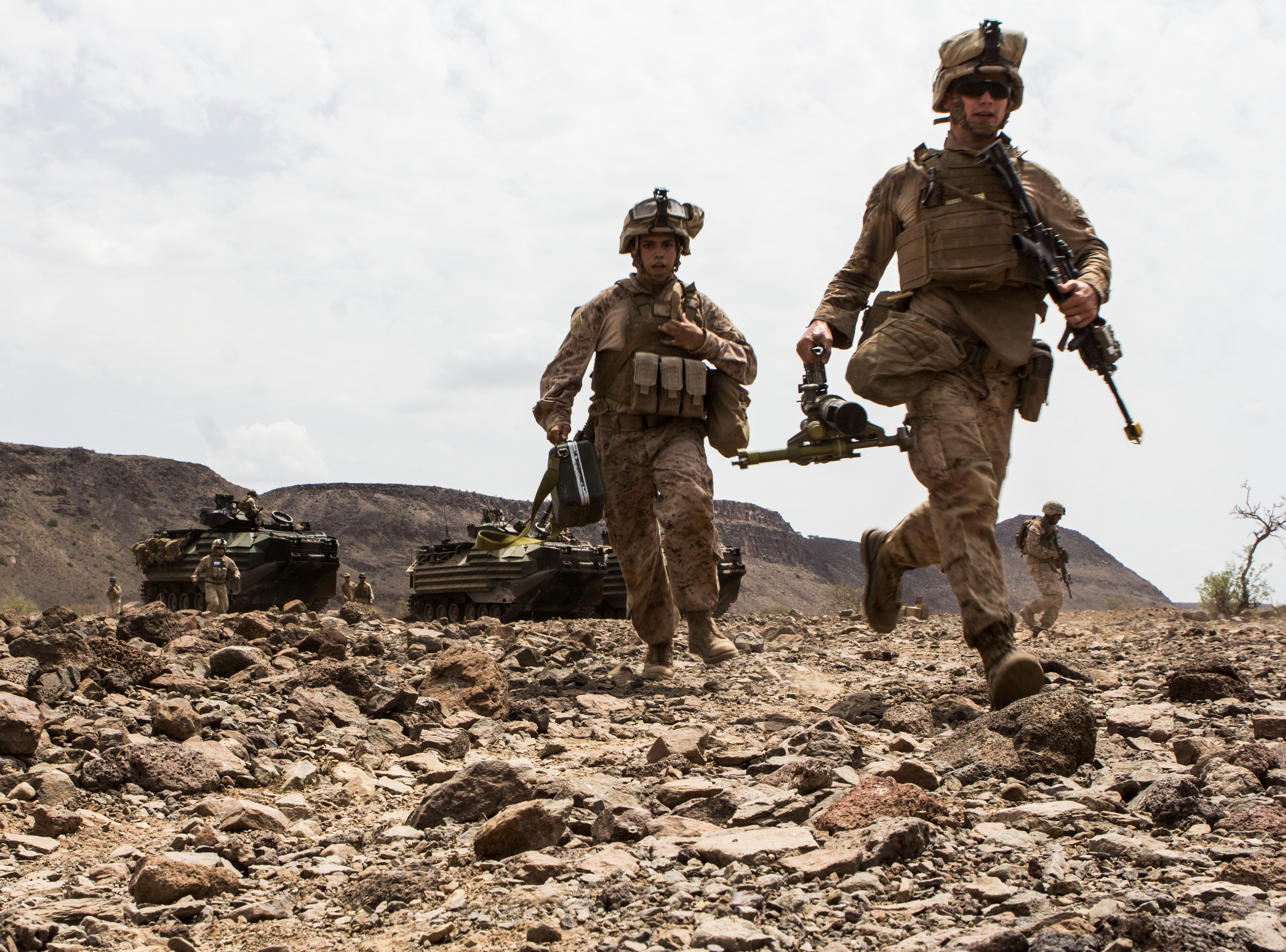
Marines of Company K, Battalion Landing Team 3/2, 26th Marine Expeditionary Unit (MEU), sprint to the gun line with their 60mm mortars during their sustainment training in the U.S. 6th Fleet area of responsibility, August 2013.

Following the events of 11 September 2001, the 26th MEU(SOC) was among the first U.S. forces into Afghanistan as part of Operation Enduring Freedom and Operation Swift Freedom. From December 2001 to February 2002, 26th MEU(SOC) Marines reinforced the 15th MEU who had conducted the 450 mile seizure of Camp Rhino in November 2001 and Kandahar International Airport in December 2001. Both MEUs worked together and constructed a detainment facility that held more than 400 Taliban and Al Qaeda terrorists.

From April to May 2003, the 26th MEU participated in the 2003 invasion of Iraq, supporting Operation Iraqi Freedom by conducting operations in Erbil and Mosul, Iraq. It was inserted via CH-53 and KC-130 and conducted combat operations until relieved by the 101st Airborne Division.

The 26th MEU served as the primary tactical unit for Joint Task Force Liberia during Operation Sheltering Sky from August to September 2003 in the Second Liberian Civil War. The MEU capitalized on its extensive training in humanitarian assistance operations and U.S. embassy relations to help bring peace to the war-torn nation following the exile of former Liberian president Charles Taylor.

Marines and sailors from the 26th MEU conducted Operation Sea Horse from July to August 2005, supporting British-led Multi-National Division Southeast with a mission to detect and deter illicit activity along the Iraqi border. The MEU maintained command and control of Operation Sea Horse from aboard ship in the Northern Persian Gulf, while simultaneously and concurrently conducting training missions in Saudi Arabia and Djibouti. In August 2008, the 26th MEU deployed aboard the ships of the Iwo Jima Strike Group. During the deployment, the 26th MEU detached to support combat operations in Iraq and in support of anti-piracy operations in the Gulf of Aden.

The 26th MEU and several other USMC units formed Special Purpose Marine Air Ground Task Force 26 in November 2009 to support the commissioning of USS New York in New York City, New York.

In August 2010, the 26th MEU sailed with the Kearsarge Amphibious Ready Group a month early for their scheduled deployment in order to assist with disaster relief operations in Pakistan.

In early March 2016, the 26th MEU took part in the Iraq Campaign of Operation Inherent Resolve against ISIL. Marines deployed to northern Iraq to set up Firebase Bell near Makhmur to support Iraqi forces in their eventual offensive to liberate ISIL-occupied Mosul. On 19 March 2016, ISIS militants attacked the fire base killing 1 Marine and injuring a further 8, the following day, coalition commanders announced that it was deploying additional Marines from the 26th MEU to Iraq.

=== Involvement in Operation Odyssey Dawn ===
Beginning on 19 March 2011, the 26th MEU took part in Operation Odyssey Dawn to help enforce the Libyan no-fly zone. On 22 March, two MV-22 Osprey, containing a payload of twenty-five USMC Recon members as a TRAP force, and operated by the 26th MEU operating off of USS Kearsarge recovered the pilot of a USAF F-15E Strike Eagle who ejected after an equipment malfunction. The Weapons Systems Officer was recovered by Libyan rebels and returned to U.S. forces unharmed.

=== Hurricane Sandy Disaster Relief Operations ===
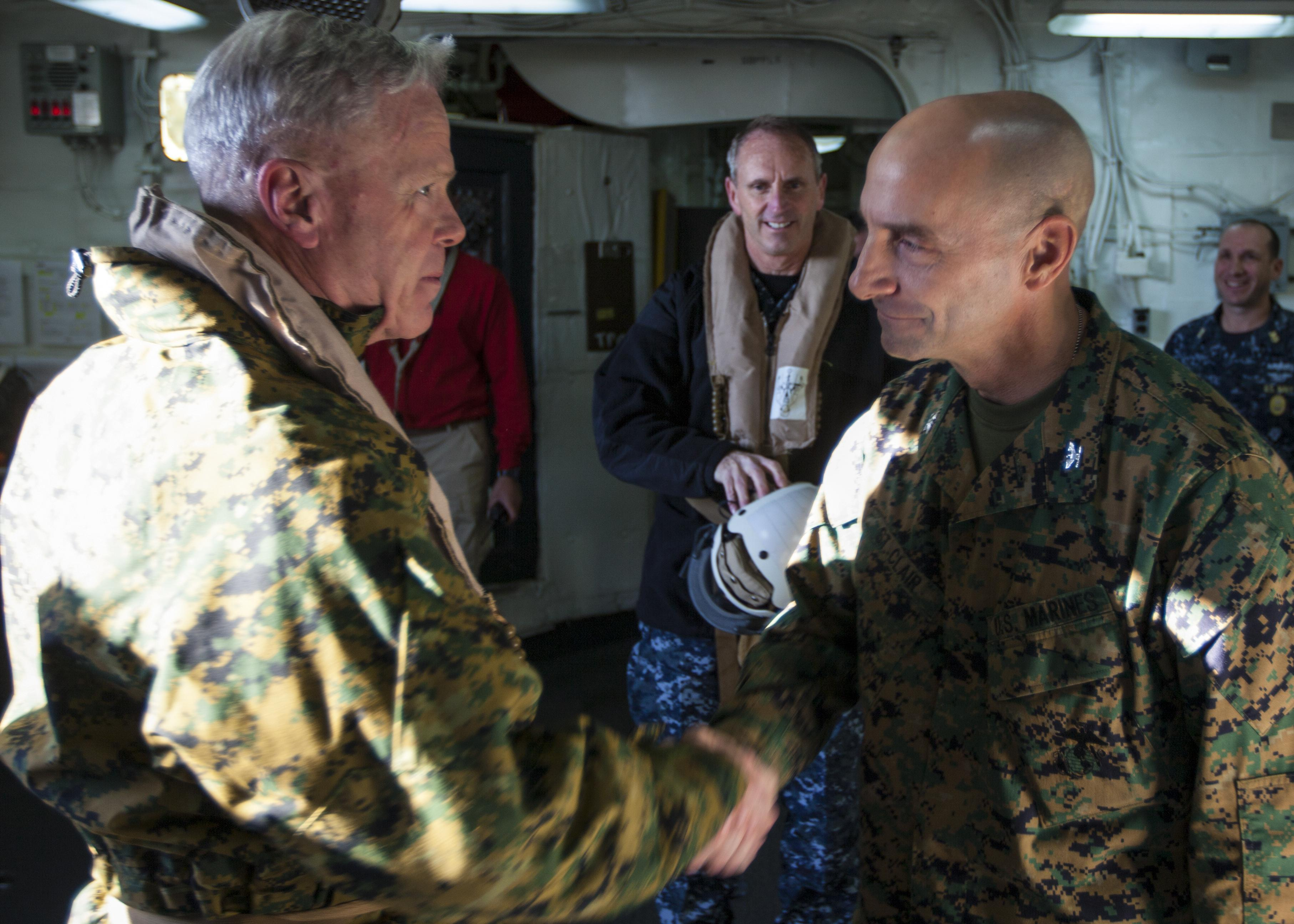
James Amos, commandant of the U.S. Marine Corps meets with Matt St. Clair, 26th MEU's commanding officer, to discuss further plans regarding Hurricane Sandy disaster relief.

In November 2012, the 26th MEU self-deployed from Camp Lejeune aboard MV-22B Osprey to the USS Wasp, which was stationed in New York Bay in the aftermath of Hurricane Sandy. There, the MEU conducted Defense Support to Civil Authorities (DSCA) operations, clearing debris, distributing food and water, and providing aid and comfort to the residents of Staten Island and Rockaway, Queens. The Marines and Sailors would move ashore by helicopter or surface craft in the morning, conduct disaster relief operations during the day, and return to the ship at night to put less strain on the stressed infrastructure ashore.

The MEU also deployed aboard USS Kearsarge (LHD-3) to the U.S. Virgin Island and Puerto Rico, as well as aboard USS Iwo Jima (LHD-7) to Key West, Florida for Defense Support to Civil Authorities (DSCA) relief efforts in the wake of Hurricanes Irma and Maria September through October of 2017

=== Recent Deployments and Operations at Sea ===
From March to November of 2013, the 26th MEU deployed to the Fifth and Sixth Fleets areas of responsibility (AORs) aboard the USS Kearsarge (LHD-3), USS San Antonio (LPD-17), and USS Carter Hall (LSD-50) with Battalion Landing Team (BLT) 3/2 as the ground combat element (GCE), Combat Logistics Battalion (CLB) 26 as the logistics combat element (LCE), and Marine Medium Tiltrotor Squadron (VMM) 266 (Reinforced) as the aviation combat element (ACE). The MEU participated in various multinational and bilateral exercises throughout Europe, the Middle East, and Africa, in addition to planning for contingency missions and acting as the nation's crisis response force in the 5th and 6th Fleet AORs. The MEU also participated in multiple diplomatic events with the Department of State.

From August 2014 to January 2015, the 26th MEU deployed in support of Special Purpose Marine Air Ground Task Force Crisis Response Africa 14.2. During this time, the MEU participated in various multinational and bilateral exercises throughout Europe.

November of 2015 marked the start of another deployment to the 5th and 6th Fleet AORs, this time aboard the USS Kearsarge (LHD-3), USS Arlington (LPD-24), and USS Oak Hill (LSD-51) with BLT 2/6 as the GCE, CLB 26 as the LCE, and VMM 162 (Rein) as the ACE. During this deployment, the 26th MEU participated in various multinational and bilateral exercises throughout Europe, the Middle East, and Africa, in addition to supporting Operation INHERENT RESOLVE in Iraq. In this capacity, the 26th MEU sent a detachment of Marines to Iraq to provide indirect fire support to assist Iraqi security forces in the country's fight against the Islamic State. This deployment concluded in June of 2016.

From September to October of 2017, the 26th MEU deployed aboard the USS Kearsarge (LHD-3) to the U.S. Virgin Islands and Puerto Rico, as well as aboard the USS Iwo Jima (LHD-7) to Key West, Florida, for Defense Support to Civil Authorities (DSCA) relief efforts in the wake of Hurricane Irma and Hurricane Maria.

February 2018 to August 2018 coincided with another deployment to the 5th and 6th Fleet AORs. The 26th MEU embarked aboard the USS Iwo Jima (LHD-7), USS New York (LPD-21), and USS Oak Hill (LSD-51) with BLT 2/6, CLB 26, and VMM 162 (Rein). In addition multinational and bilateral exercises, the 26th MEU also provided aviation support with to Operation INHERENT RESOLVE in Iraq.

In December 2019, the 26th MEU deployed to 2nd, 5th, and 6th Fleet AORs aboard the USS Bataan (LHD-5), USS New York (LPD-21), and USS Oak Hill (LSD-51) with BLT 2/8, CLB 26, and VMM 365 (Rein). Bilateral training took place throughout the Mediterranean and Africa, and the AV-8B Harrier detachment provided air support for Operation INHERENT RESOLVE from Isa Air Base. From January to February of 2020, the MEU participated in Exercise JOINT VIKING 21 in Norway, with elements of the MEU participating in Exercise NARVAL in Toulon, France before conducting the Caribbean Urban Warrior exercise near Camp Lejeune, North Carolina with Dutch partners. This deployment ended in July 2020, shortly after the outbreak of the COVID-19 pandemic.

=== Operations ALLIES WELCOME ===
On the 20th anniversary of 9/11, the 26th MEU rapidly deployed within 72 hours of notification in support of Operation ALLIES WELCOME at Fort Pickett, Virginia. The 26th MEU formed as Task Force Pickett and was responsible for providing security for, ensuring safety of, and managing processing of approximately 10,000 Afghan evacuees transitioning to the U.S. after attacks in Kabul following the evacuation of the U.S. Embassy in Afghanistan and concurrent withdrawal of U.S. military forces.

=== 2023 MEU(SOC) Redesignation and Deployment ===
Prior to deployment in July of 2023, the 26th MEU was designated as Special Operations Capable following an enhanced pre-deployment training program that centered on Special Operations Forces integration, interoperability, and interdependence. This was the first time in two decades that a MEU had earned and been employed with the MEU(SOC) designation, a designation that further demonstrates the Marine Corps' ability to partner with, complement, enable, and integrate with Joint and Coalition Special Operations Forces in support of campaigns, crisis response, and deterrence.

While deployed, more than 4,000 Marines and sailors supported a wide range of interoperability training, exercises, and operations within the U.S. 5th and 6th Fleet areas of operations; covering the High North, Baltic Sea, Eastern Mediterranean, Arabian Gulf, Red Sea, and Middle East.

The 26th MEU(SOC) supported operations and engagements, conducted theater security cooperation activities, participated in bilateral training with U.S. NATO allies and partners, and executed sustainment training to ensure the force was ready and postured to respond to crisis in the region. During this deployment, the 26th MEU(SOC) served as the nation's premier response force, capable of conducting amphibious operations, crisis response, and limited contingency operations, to include enabling the introductions of follow-on forces and designated special operations, in support of theater requirements of the Geographic Combatant Commanders.

The 26th MEU(SOC) was composed of Battalion Landing Team (BLT) 1/6, Combat Logistics Battalion (CLB) 22, and Marine Medium Tiltrotor Squadron (VMM) 162 (Reinforced). The Marines and sailors of the 26th MEU(SOC) deployed aboard the flagship Wasp-class amphibious assault ship USS Bataan (LHD 50), the San Antonio-class amphibious transport dock USS Mesa Verde (LPD 19) and the Harpers Ferry-class dock landing ship USS Carter Hall (LSD 50). During this deployment, there was a Special Operations component onboard, consisting of a Navy Special Operations Officer, a Navy Special Operations communicator, and an Army Special Operations communications Soldier, reporting directly to SOCOM.

== 26th MEU commanding officers ==
Col. Michael Myatt 1985–1987	Col. John B. Creel Jr., 1987–1989
Col. Emerson N. Gardner, 1996–1998	Col. Kenneth J. Glueck Jr., August 1998 – 2001
Col. Andrew P. Frick, 2001–2003	Col. Thomas F. Qualls, 2003 – May 2006
Col. Gregg Sturdevant, May 2006 – May 2008	Col. Mark J. Desens, 2008 – June 2011
Col. Matthew G. St. Clair, June 2011 – June 2014	Col. Robert C. Fulford, June 2014 – 2016
Col. Farrell J. Sullivan, 2016 – December 2018	Col. Trevor Hall, December 2018 – August 2020
Col. Dennis W. Sampson, August 2020 – May 2024	Col. James B. Reid, May 2024 – present

== Notable facts ==
- 1995 – The first MEU (SOC) to deploy with M1A1 Abrams Main Battle Tanks.
- 1996 – The first MEU (SOC) to deploy with the Joint Task Force Enabler (JTFE) communications package.
- November 2000 – The 26th MEU's Battalion Landing Team, BLT 2/2, launched the first-ever FGM-148 Javelin anti-tank missile fired by a deployed MEU.
- November 2001 – During Operation Enduring Freedom, the 26th MEU (SOC) became one of the first units to engage enemy forces in Afghanistan after the terrorist attacks of 9/11.
- April 2003 – In 2003, during Operation Iraqi Freedom, Marine Corps KC-130s traveled 1,100 miles (1,800 km) and delivered more than 1,000 men directly to the battlefield in Mosul, Iraq – a feat never before attempted by Marines.
- January 2007 – The MEU (SOC) is the first to deploy with a MARSOC attachment.
- March 2009 – The 26th MEU (SOC) completes the final scheduled East Coast MEU (SOC) deployment with the CH-46 Sea Knight helicopter, which is being replaced by the MV-22 Osprey.
- August 2010 – The first MEU (SOC) to deploy with an Everything over Internet Protocol (EoIP) configured Joint Task Force Enabler (JTFE) communications package.

== Unit awards ==
The 26th MEU has been awarded the following unit awards and Campaign streamers:

- Navy Unit Commendation Streamer with Four Bronze Stars
  - Libya, 6th Fleet, 23 March - 17 April 1986
  - Kosovo, JTF Noble Anvil, 31 January - 10 July 1999
  - Afghanistan, 5th Fleet, 15 November 2001 - 22 March 2002
  - Iraq, 5th Fleet, 1 January - 1 May 2003
- Meritorious Unit Commendation Streamer with Two Bronze Stars
  - Libya, 19 July 1985 - 25 July 1987
  - May 1996 - July 1998
  - Turkey, Avid Response, 21 August - 10 September 1999
- Marine Corps Expeditionary Streamer with One Bronze Star
  - Libya, 23 March - 17 April 1986
  - Persian Gulf, 1 February - 23 July 1987
- National Defense Service Streamer with Two Bronze Stars
  - 24 April - 20 October 1967 and 11 June - 28 December 1969
  - 2 August 1990 - 30 November 1995
  - 11 September 2001 - 31 December 2022
- Kosovo Campaign Streamer with Two Bronze Stars
  - 25 April - 5 June 1999
  - 10 June - 15 July 1999
- Afghanistan Campaign Streamer with Two Bronze Stars
  - Liberation, 15 - 30 November 2001
  - Consolidation I, 1 December 2001 - 9 February 2002
- Global War on Terrorism Expeditionary Streamer
  - Iraq, April - May 2003
- Global War on Terrorism Service Streamer
  - 11 September 2001

== See also ==
- List of Marine Expeditionary Units
- List of United States Marine Corps battalions
- List of United States Marine Corps aircraft squadrons
- List of United States Marine Corps logistics groups
