= Kara Soar Base =

- Makhmur, Iraq

Site information
- Owner: Iraqi Armed Forces; United States Department of Defense
- Controlled by: United States Marine Corps; United States Army
- Condition: Active

Site history
- Built: 2016
- Built by: U.S. Marine Corps
- In use: 2016
- Battles/wars: Third Iraq War

Kara Soar Base was an American fire support base in northern Iraq.

== History ==
=== Task Force Spartan ===
In early 2016 in support of a planned Iraqi offensive against ISIS-held Mosul, US forces established a firebase called Bell, approximately 15 miles from ISIS lines. 200 US Marines and 8 US Army Soldiers emplaced and manned 4 M777A2 howitzers.

One Marine, SSGT Louis F Cardin was killed in a rocket attack on March 19, 2016, only two days after the battery arrived. A couple of days later on March 21, the base was attacked by ISIS suicide bombers armed with small arms. Several Iraqi soldiers were killed during this attack, and the enemy force was attritted by self-detonation of their suicide vests and suppression from Iraqi soldiers and US Marines.

The Marine howitzers fired every day in support of Iraqi maneuvers, using high-explosive, smoke, and illumination rounds.

By March 30, 2016, the Pentagon renamed the base to "Kara Soar Counter Fire Complex" to reinforce the notion that the firebase was conducting "defensive missions." However some point after the base was renamed to Kara Soar Base.

== Units ==
- Battery E and Company E, Battalion Landing Team 2/6, 26th Marine Expeditionary Unit (Task Force Spartan) between at least March and May 2016.
- Battery A, 1-182nd Field Artillery Regiment (HIMARS) (Task Force Sudden Death) Detroit, MI. May 2016-August 2016
- Battery B, 3-321st Field Artillery Regiment (HiMARS) (Task Force ODIN) Fort Bragg, North Carolina. July 2016-September 2016
- Battery HHB, 7th Field Artillery Regiment, 2nd Armored Brigade Combat Team, 1st Infantry Division, Between at least March and June 2016.
- Battery C, 1st Battalion, 320th Field Artillery Regiment, 2nd Brigade Combat Team, 101st Airborne Division (Air Assault) (Task Force Strike) between at least June and August 2016.
- Troop A, 1st Squadron, 75th Cavalry Regiment, 2nd Brigade Combat Team, 101st Airborne Division (Air Assault) (Task Force Strike) between at least June and August 2016.
- Battery C, 2d Battalion, 44th Air Defense Artillery Regiment, 108th Air Defense Artillery Brigade between April 2016 and August 2016.
- ADAM Cell, HHC, 2nd Brigade Combat Team, 101st Airborne Division (Air Assault) (Task Force Strike) between at least May and August 2016.

== See also ==
- Camp Speicher
