= USS Kearsarge (LHD-3) =

Amphibious assault ship of the U.S. Navy

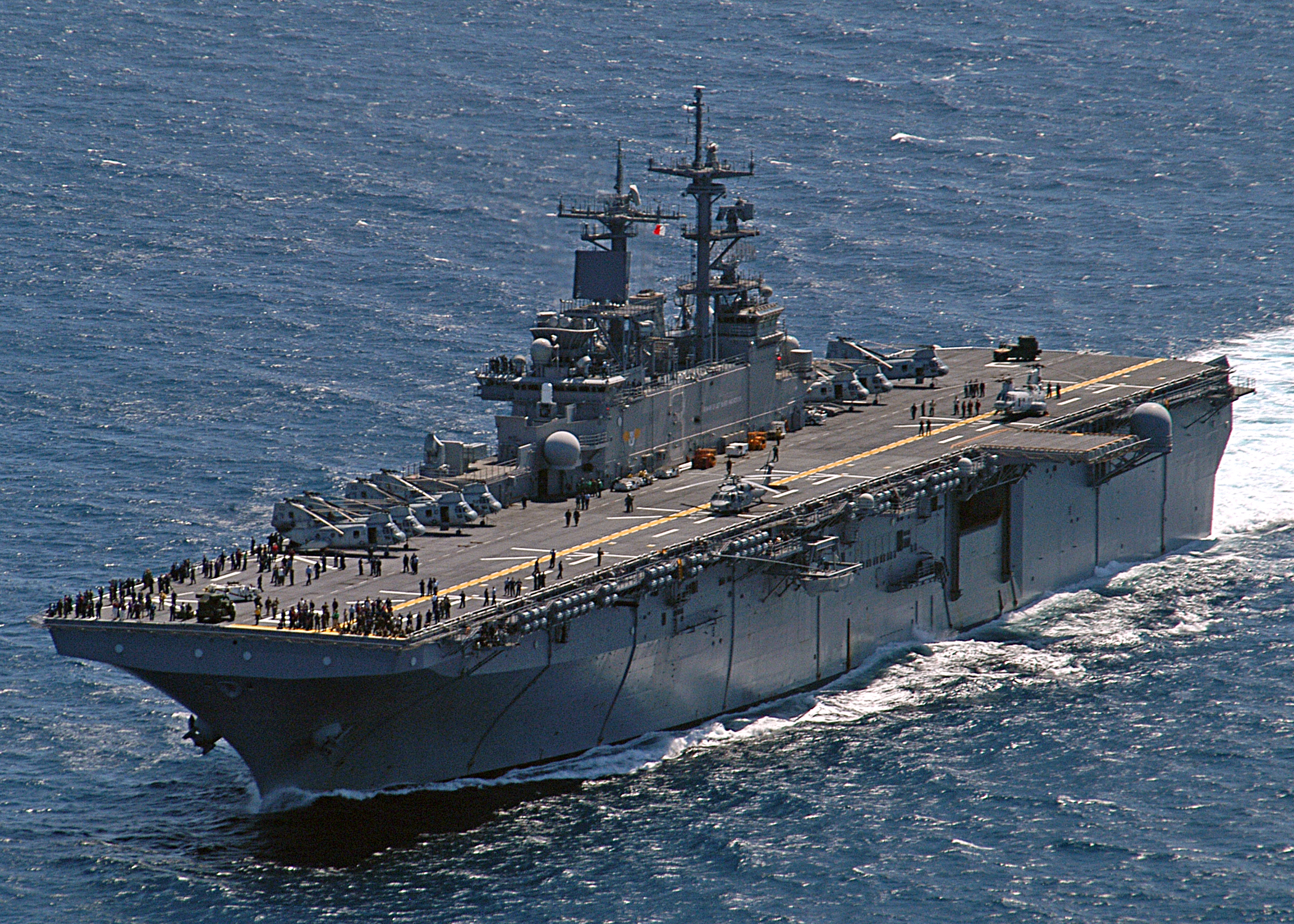
- USS Kearsarge (LHD-3)

History

United States
- Name: Kearsarge
- Namesake: USS Kearsarge
- Builder: Ingalls Shipbuilding
- Laid down: 6 February 1990
- Launched: 26 March 1992
- Sponsored by: Alma Powell
- Christened: 16 May 1992
- Commissioned: 16 October 1993
- Home port: Norfolk
- Identification: MMSI number: 368702000; Callsign: NNKP; Hull number: LHD-3
- Motto: Proud—Trustworthy—Bold
- Status: in active service
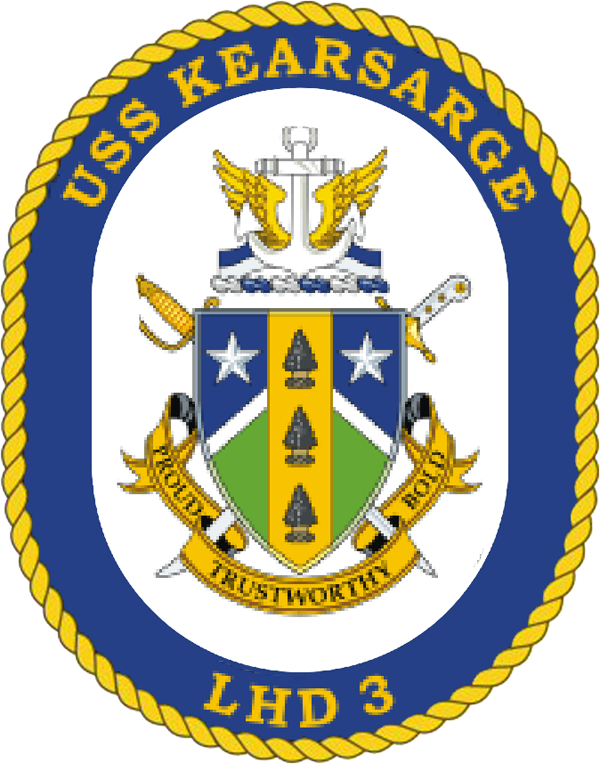
- Badge

General characteristics
- Type: Wasp-class amphibious assault ship
- Displacement: 40,500 long tons (41,150 t) full load
- Length: 843 ft 2 in (257 m)
- Beam: 104 ft 4 in (31.8 m)
- Draft: 26 ft 7 in (8.1 m)
- Propulsion: Two boilers, two geared steam turbines, two shafts, 70,000 shp (52,000 kW);
- Speed: 22 knots (41 km/h; 25 mph)
- Range: 9,500 nmi (17,600 km; 10,900 mi) at 18 kn (33 km/h; 21 mph)
- Well deck dimensions: 266-by-50-foot (81 by 15.2 m) by 28-foot (8.5 m) high
- Boats & landing craft carried: 3 Landing Craft Air Cushion or; 2 Landing Craft Utility or; 12 Landing Craft Mechanized
- Troops: 1,687 troops (plus 184 surge) Marine Detachment
- Complement: 1,208 men
- Sensors & processing systems: 1 AN/SPS-49 2-D Air Search Radar; 1 AN/SPS-48 3-D Air Search Radar; 1 AN/SPS-67 Surface Search Radar; 1 Mk23 Target Acquisition System (TAS); 1 AN/SPN-43 Marshalling Air Traffic Control Radar; 1 AN/SPN-35 Air Traffic Control Radar; 1 AN/URN-25 TACAN system; 1 AN/UPX-24 Identification Friend Foe
- Armament: Two RIM-116 Rolling Airframe Missile launchers; Two RIM-7 Sea Sparrow missile launchers; three 20 mm Phalanx CIWS systems; Four 25 mm Mk 38 chain guns; Four .50 BMG machine guns
- Aircraft carried: Actual mix depends on the mission; Standard Complement: 6 AV-8B Harrier II attack aircraft; or; 6 F-35B Lightning II stealth strike-fighters; 4 AH-1W /Z Super Cobra /Viper attack helicopter; 12 MV-22B Osprey assault support tiltrotor; 4 CH-53E Super Stallion heavy-lift helicopters; 3–4 UH-1Y Venom utility helicopters; Assault: 22+ MV-22B Osprey assault support tiltrotor; Sea Control: 20 AV-8B Harrier II attack aircraft; or; 20 F-35B Lightning II stealth strike-fighters; 6 SH-60F/HH-60H ASW helicopters

USS Kearsarge (LHD-3) is the third Wasp-class amphibious assault ship of the United States Navy. She is the fifth ship to bear that name, but the fourth to serve under it, as the third was renamed Hornet (CV-12) before launching (after the prior Hornet was sunk).

== Etymology ==
Named in honor of USS Kearsarge, a sloop-of-war that gained fame hunting Confederate raiders during the American Civil War. The sloop was named for Mount Kearsarge in Merrimack County, New Hampshire.

== Construction ==
Kearsarge's keel was laid down on 6 February 1990 at Litton-Ingalls Shipbuilding Corporation of Pascagoula, Mississippi.

Ingalls built Kearsarge using efficient pre-outfitting and modular construction techniques. Hundreds of smaller sub-assemblies, containing piping, ventilation ducting and other hardware, as well as major machinery equipment, generators, and electrical panels were constructed. The sub-assemblies were then joined with others to form assemblies, which were in turn welded together to form five completed hull and superstructure modules. These giant modules, each weighing thousands of tons, were joined on land to form the completed ship's hull. The result of this early outfitting was a ship that was over 70 percent complete at launch.

She was launched on 26 March 1992, in a ceremony attended by then-Chairman of the Joint Chiefs of Staff General Colin Powell. The warship was christened on 16 May 1992, and commissioned on 16 October 1993.

== Characteristics ==
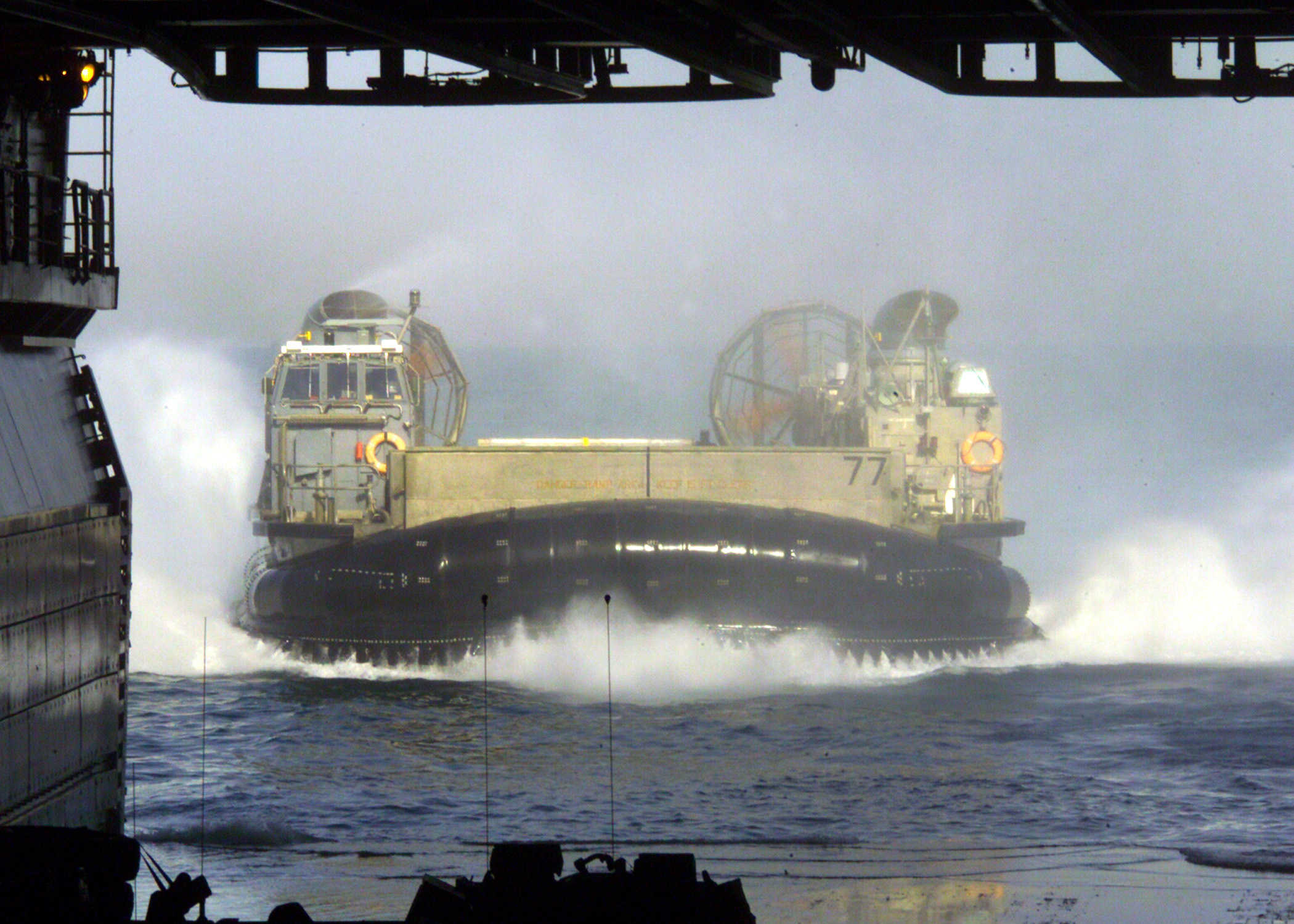
A Landing Craft Air Cushion returns to the well deck

The assault support system on the ship coordinates vertical and horizontal movement of troops, cargo and vehicles. A Monorail system, moving at speeds up to 600 ft/min (3 m/s), transports cargo and supplies from storage and staging areas throughout the ship to a 13,600-square-foot (1,260 m^{2}) well deck, which opens to the sea through huge gates in the ship's stern. There, the cargo, troops and vehicles are loaded onto landing craft for transit to the beach. The air cushion landing craft can "fly" out of the dry well deck, or the well deck can be flooded so that conventional landing craft can float out on their way to the beach.

Simultaneously, helicopters can be lifted from the hangar deck to the flight deck by two deck-edge elevators and loaded with supplies from three massive cargo elevators.

Kearsarge's armament suite includes the NATO RIM-7 Sea Sparrow point defense system for anti-aircraft support, RIM-116 Rolling Airframe Missiles, 25-mm chain guns and the Phalanx close-in weapon system to counter threats from low-flying aircraft and close-in small craft. Missile decoy launchers augment the anti-ship missile defenses.

== Operations ==
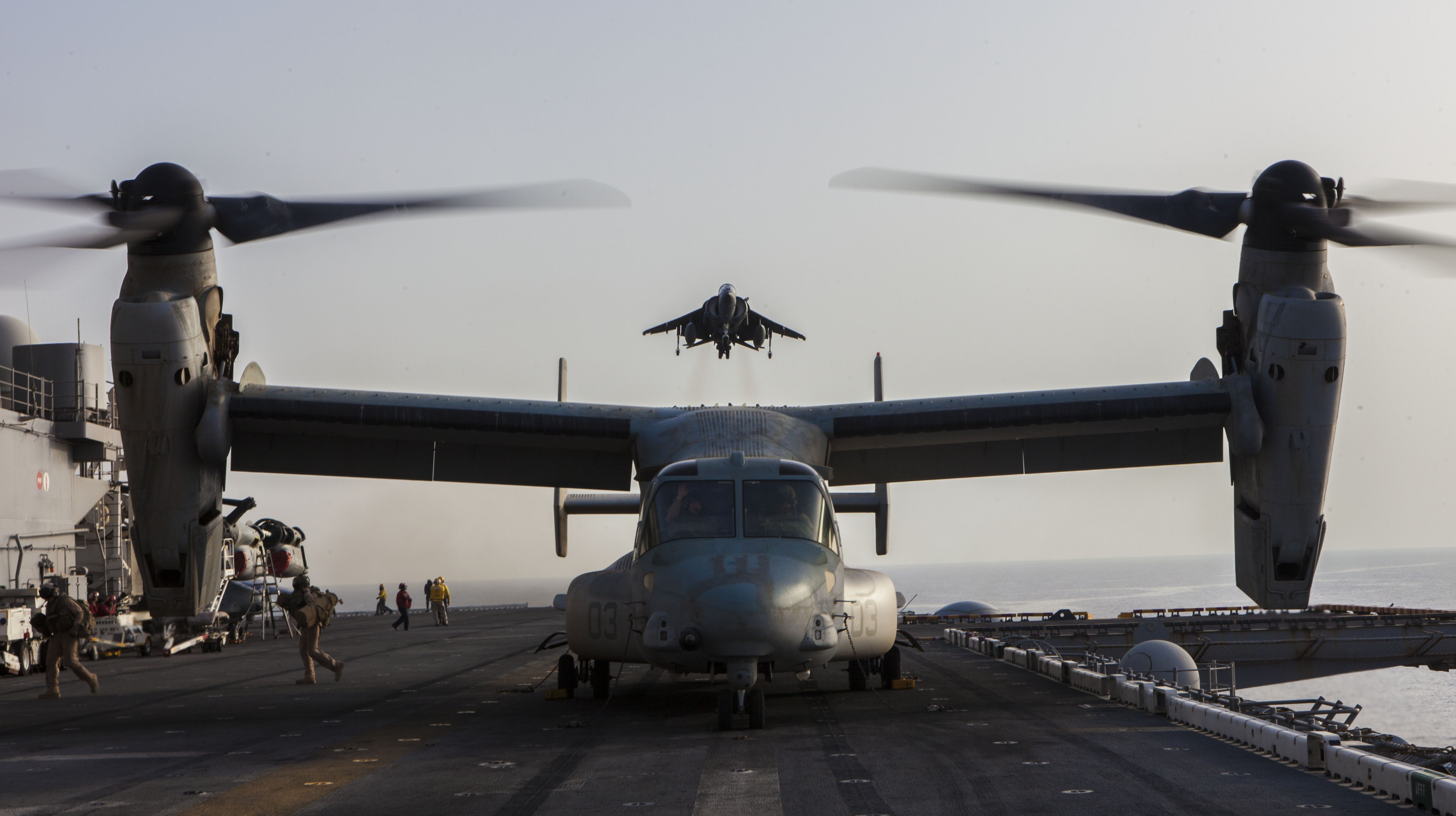
An AV-8B Harrier about to land on Kearsarge as an MV-22B Osprey prepares to launch.

U.S. Ambassador Dan Shapiro visits Kearsarge in Eilat, Israel.

Kearsarge is capable of amphibious assault, advance force and special purpose operations, as well as non-combatant evacuation and other humanitarian missions. Since her commissioning, she has performed these missions all over the world, including evacuating non-combatants from Freetown, Sierra Leone, on 31 May 1997 and rescuing Air Force Captain Scott O'Grady, whose F-16 aircraft had been shot down over Serb-controlled territory in Bosnia on 8 June 1995, while taking part of Operation Deny Fly.

Operation Noble Obelisk was the evacuation of civilians from Sierra Leone in 1997 undertaken by USS Kearsarge. More than 400 Americans and more than 3,000 third-country nationals were taken aboard Kearsarge over 4 days.

Additionally, Kearsarge is fully equipped with state-of-the-art command and control (C&C) systems for flagship command duty, and her medical facilities are second in capability only to the Navy's hospital ships, USNS Comfort and USNS Mercy. These facilities allowed Kearsarge to serve a dual role during the NATO bombing of Yugoslavia in 1999, as a platform for bombing missions against Yugoslav forces in Operation Allied Force, and as a treatment facility for Kosovar refugees in Operation Shining Hope. In August 1999, Kearsarge participated in relief efforts for Operation Avid Response.

On 19 August 2005, Kearsarge and USS Ashland were targeted by rockets while in port in Jordan. The rockets flew over Ashland's bow and struck the pier adjacent to the ships. The vessels were not hit but one Jordanian soldier was killed and another was wounded. The sailors aboard both warships were awarded the Combat Action Ribbon as a result of the attack.

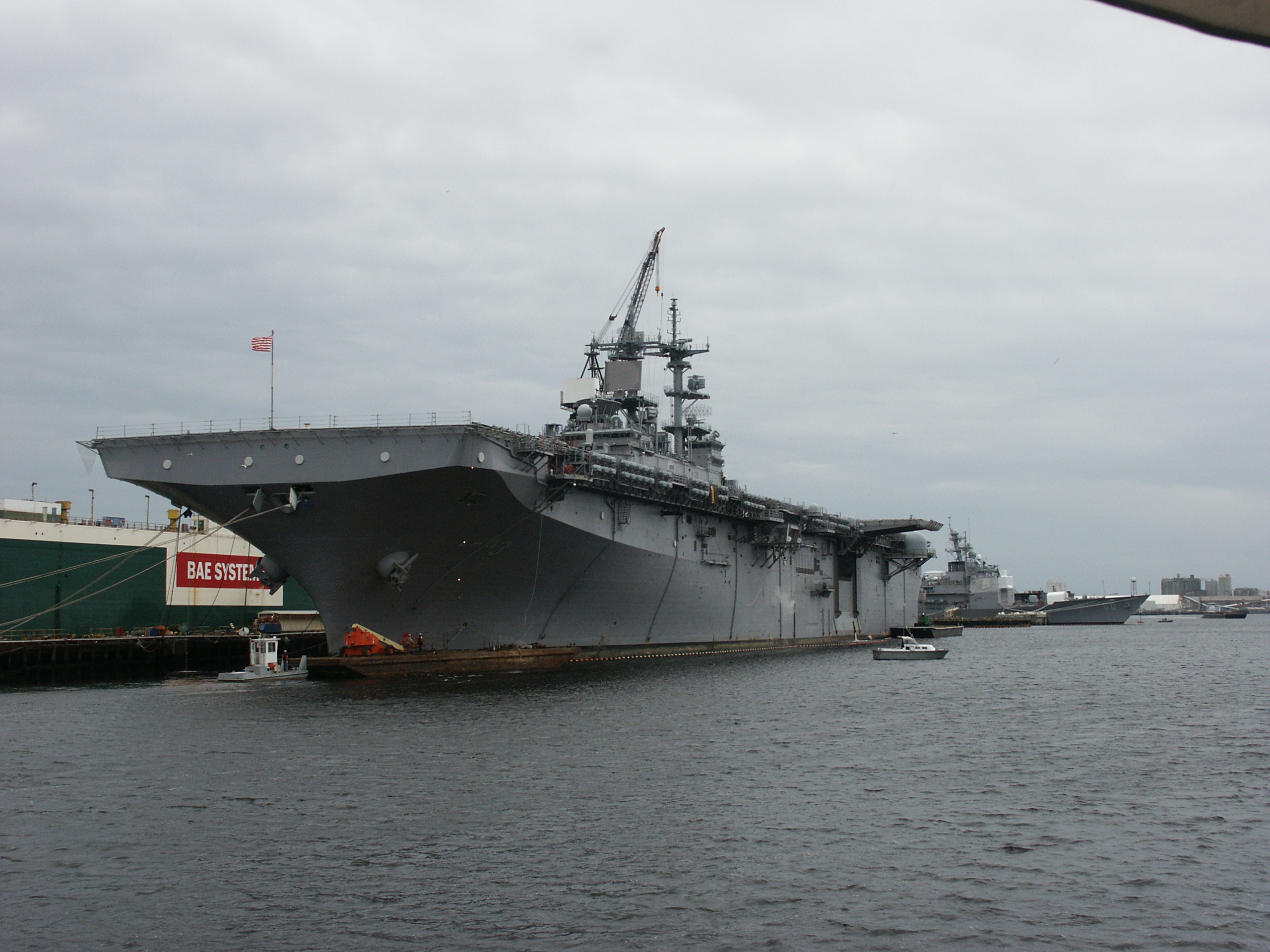
Kearsarge docked in Portsmouth, 2006

In 1994, 2006, 2008, and again in 2017, USS Kearsarge served as the principal attraction for New York's "Fleet Week". In August 2007, the ship visited the port of Valletta, Malta on the way to a six-month deployment to Iraq (5th Fleet AOR). The ship deployed Sailors and Marines in a relief effort in Bangladesh following Cyclone Sidr and provided support for President George W. Bush's January 2008 visit to Israel.

On 6 August 2008, Kearsarge deployed in support of Operation Continuing Promise. The ship's crew, along with augments from the United States Marine Corps, the United States Air Force, the United States Army, the United States Coast Guard, the United States Public Health Service, Canadian Forces, and other multi-national forces and NGO's, provided medical, construction and humanitarian services to six Central, South, and Caribbean American countries (Colombia, the Dominican Republic, Guyana, Haiti, Nicaragua, and Trinidad). The ship also provided Humanitarian Assistance and Disaster Relief (HA/DR) operations in Haiti following four Atlantic hurricanes.

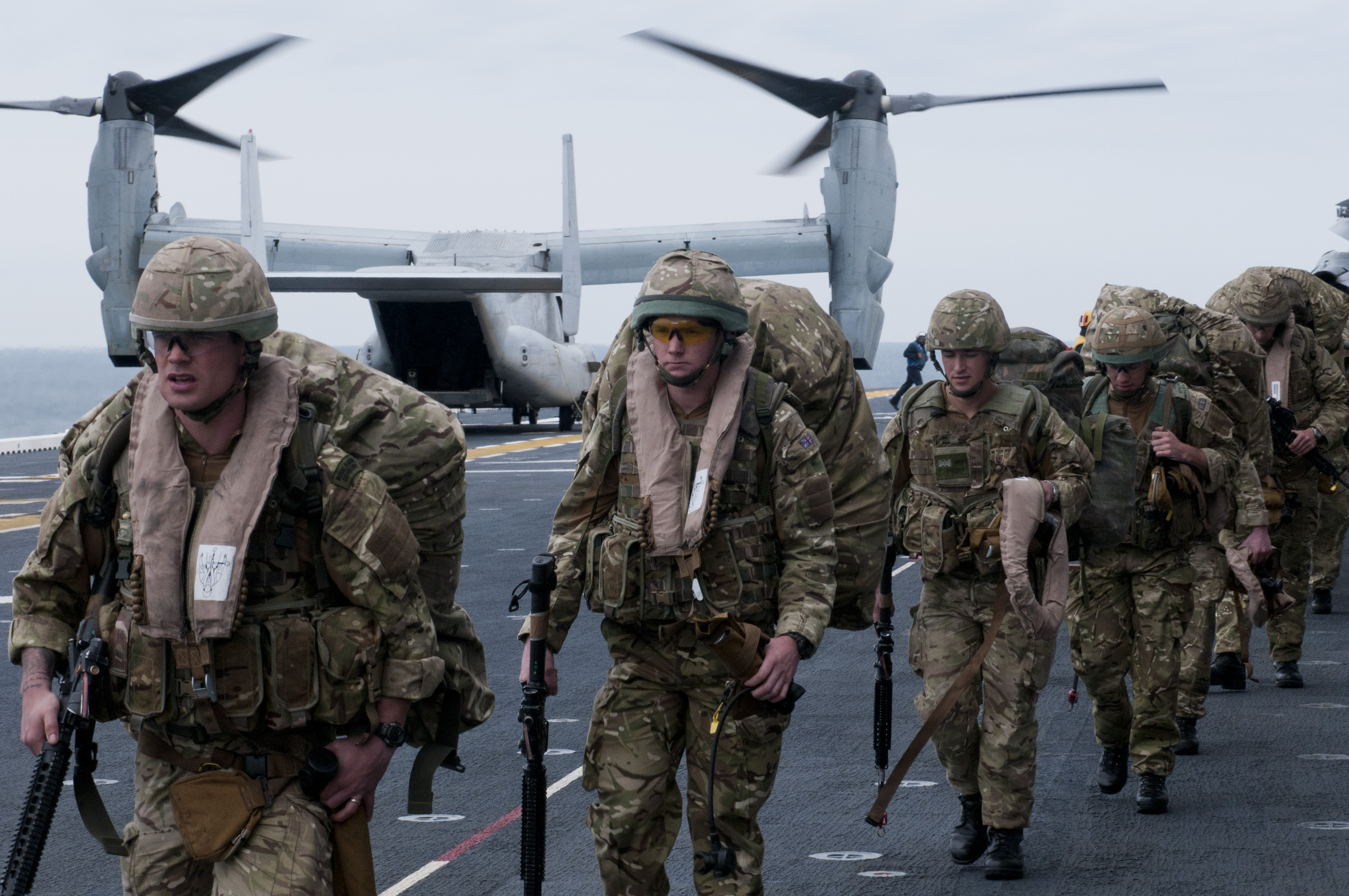
British Royal Marines on Kearsarge's flight deck

On 2 March 2011, Kearsarge, along with USS Ponce, traveled through the Suez Canal in response to the 2011 Libyan civil war. Robert Gates had said days earlier that he ordered the two warships into the Mediterranean, along with an extra 400 Marines, in case they are needed to evacuate civilians or provide humanitarian relief. As of 20 March, AV-8B Harrier II attack aircraft from Kearsarge have been reported attacking Libyan targets as part of Operation Odyssey Dawn. On 22 March, V-22 Ospreys from Kearsarge conducted a successful TRAP operation to recover the crew of a USAF F-15E Strike Eagle after it crashed in Libya due to a mechanical failure during a combat mission. The Daily Telegraph reported a military source, stating that, during the rescue, strafing runs were carried out and two Harriers dropped two 500 lb bombs on a convoy of Libyan vehicles, with other reports alleging that Libyan civilians were wounded in the operation. The ship returned to home port at Norfolk on 16 May 2011.

Following a three-day delay due to bad weather, Kearsarge deployed from Naval Station Norfolk on 11 March 2013 for a scheduled eight-month deployment. One of her first port visits was to Cyprus. Kearsarge later docked at the Israeli port of Eilat for several days beginning on 14 May 2013 before continuing her deployment. One of her MV-22s exercised in a joint operation with HMS Illustrious.

In September 2017, Kearsarge was called upon to assist in search-and-rescue operations during Hurricane Maria, after contact was lost with a ship carrying four people that issued a distress signal while battling 20 ft (6.1 m) seas and 100 mph (160 km/h) winds off the coast of Vieques, Puerto Rico. The United States Coast Guard, Navy, and the Royal Navy utilized an HC-130 aircraft, a fast response cutter, and Navy helicopters. A woman and two children were rescued, but a man died aboard their capsized vessel.

Kearsarge participated in Ft. Lauderdale's 2018 Fleet Week.

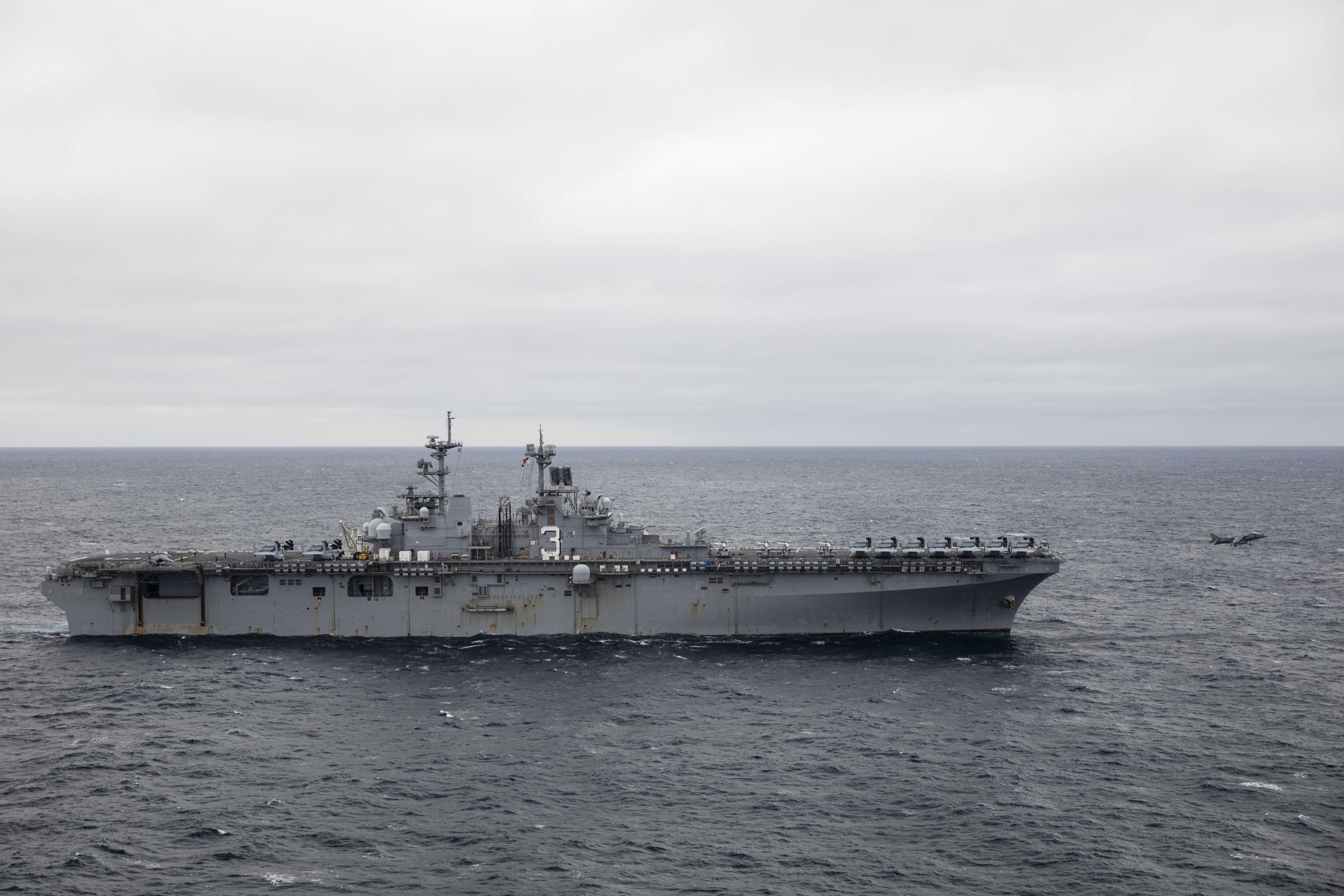
Kearsarge during Exercise Northern Viking 2022

On 13 May 2022, Kearsarge took part in a PASSEX training with the Finnish and Swedish navies in the northern Baltic Sea. From 17 May to 23 May, Kearsarge and her amphibious readiness group took part in the NATO vigilance activity, Neptune Shield 2022. On 27 May, Kearsarge docked at Tallinn, Estonia ahead of Exercise BALTOPS 2022. During BALTOPS 2022 Kearsarge trained operating UUVs and UAVs. On 2 June, she arrived in Stockholm, Sweden. On 20 August, she arrived in Klaipėda, Lithuania.

On February 10 2026, US Marine Corps F-35B Lightning II's assigned to VMFA-542 landed on the Kearsarge. This marks the first time the Joint Strike Fighter has landed on this vessel.

In 2026, the Kearsarge took part in Sail 250. The public was given tours of the ship.

== Deployments ==
- January to August 1995; Mediterranean
- April to October 1997 - North Atlantic - Mediterranean
- April to October 1999; Mediterranean
- April to October 2001; Mediterranean
- January to July 2003; North Atlantic - Mediterranean - Indian Ocean - Persian Gulf
- March to October 2005; Mediterranean
- September 2007 to February 2008; Mediterranean - Indian Ocean - Persian Gulf.
- August 2010 to May 2011; Mediterranean - West Africa
- March 2013 to November 2013 - Mediterranean - Red Sea - Persian Gulf
- October 2015 to May 2016; Mediterranean - Indian Ocean - Persian Gulf
- August 2017 to November 2017; Caribbean Sea after hurricanes Irma and Maria
- December 2018 to July 2019; Mediterranean - Indian Ocean - Persian Gulf
- March 2022 to October 2022; Baltic Sea, (and the BALTOPS 2022 exercise in June)

== Awards ==
USS Kearsarge has been awarded the Golden Anchor for Retention Excellence, Ronald Reagan Distinguished Service Award, the CNO Environmental Safety Award, the Admiral Flatley Memorial Award (aviation safety), SECNAV Energy Award (2002), Department of Energy (DOE) Federal Energy Management Program (FEMP) Mobility Energy Efficiency Award (2002), the Chief of Naval Operations Safety Award and the Commander Naval Surface Force Atlantic Safety Award.

Additionally, Kearsarge has qualified for the following medals and unit awards: Combat Action Ribbon, Humanitarian award, Navy Unit Commendation (three awards), Meritorious Unit Commendation (one award), Battle Efficiency "E" Award (seven awards), National Defense Service Medal (two awards), Global War on Terrorism Expeditionary Medal, Kosovo Campaign Medal (with bronze star), Armed Forces Service Medal, Sea Service Deployment Ribbon (five awards), and the NATO Medal.

== Shield and crest ==
Blue and gold are colors traditionally associated with the Navy and symbolize the sea and excellence. The green chevron suggests the green-peaked Mount Kearsarge in New Hampshire. The amphibious nature of the combat operations of the present USS Kearsarge is represented by green and blue, alluding land and sea. The arrowheads, together with the white chevronel, which represents a shore line, allude to assault landings. The stars commemorate the battle stars the third Kearsarge received for Korean War and Vietnam War service.

The wings of the crest symbolize the aviation capabilities of both the present and the third Kearsarge; they are gold for the honor and achievement. The white anchor recalls the round-the-world cruise of the second Kearsarge of the Great White Fleet in 1907 and denotes the naval prowess of the USS Kearsarges. The blue-and-gray wavy bar highlights the Civil War service for the first USS Kearsarge. The swords (one a Navy cutlass and the other a Marine mameluke) are crossed, to denote cooperation and teamwork, as well as the combined combat mission of the U.S. Navy and Marine Corps. Motto ~ "Proud ... Bold ... Trustworthy."

== See also ==
- Tarawa-class amphibious assault ship
- America-class amphibious assault ship
- New Hampshire Historical Marker No. 243: Mount Kearsarge and the U.S.S. Kearsarge
