= San Francisco Veterans Memorial =

Memorial in California

- United States
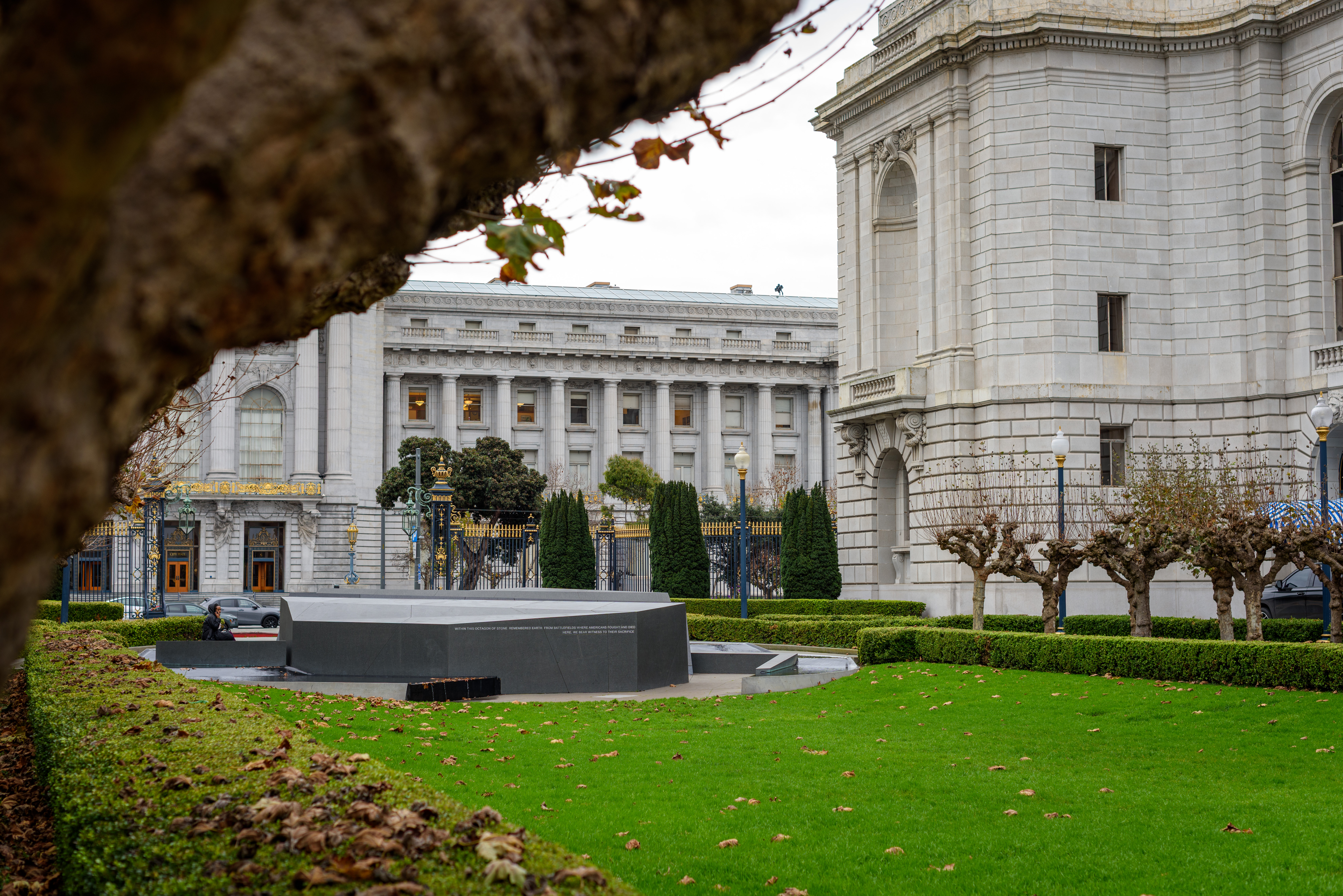
- The memorial, looking across Memorial Court (the lawn).
- For Veterans
- Established: 2014
- Location: 37.779077°N 122.420851°W; Civic Center near San Francisco
- "The Young Dead Soldiers Do Not Speak"

The San Francisco Veterans Memorial is a memorial commemorating veterans in San Francisco's Civic Center, in the U.S. state of California. The stone octagon memorial, located across from San Francisco City Hall between Herbst Theatre and War Memorial Opera House, was dedicated in 2014. Inscribed in the stone is Archibald MacLeish's poem, "The Young Dead Soldiers Do Not Speak".

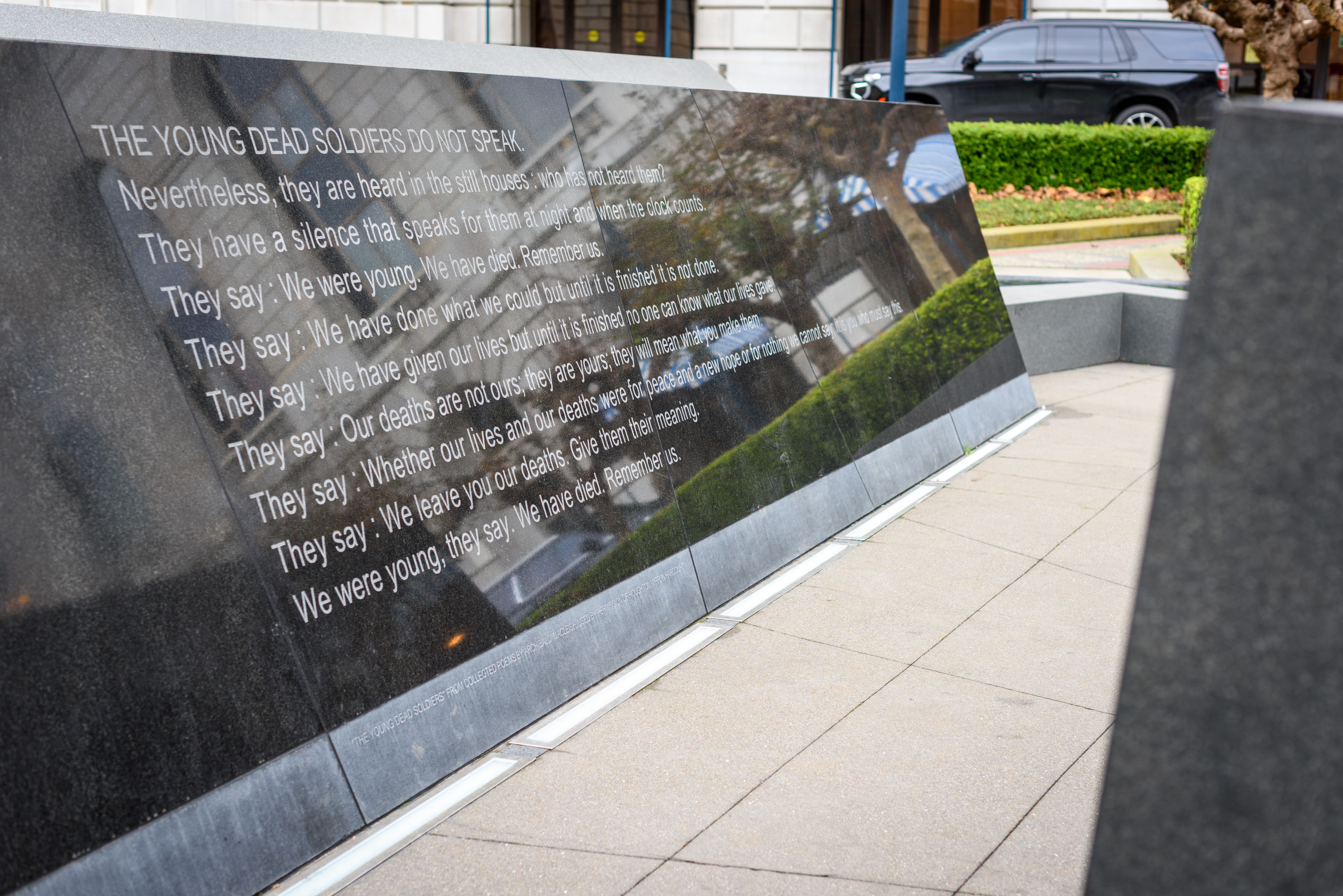
The inscription in the middle of the memorial.
