= Operation Avid Response =

1999 humanitarian relief effort from the United States to Turkey

- Part of humanitarian relief to the 1999 İzmit earthquake
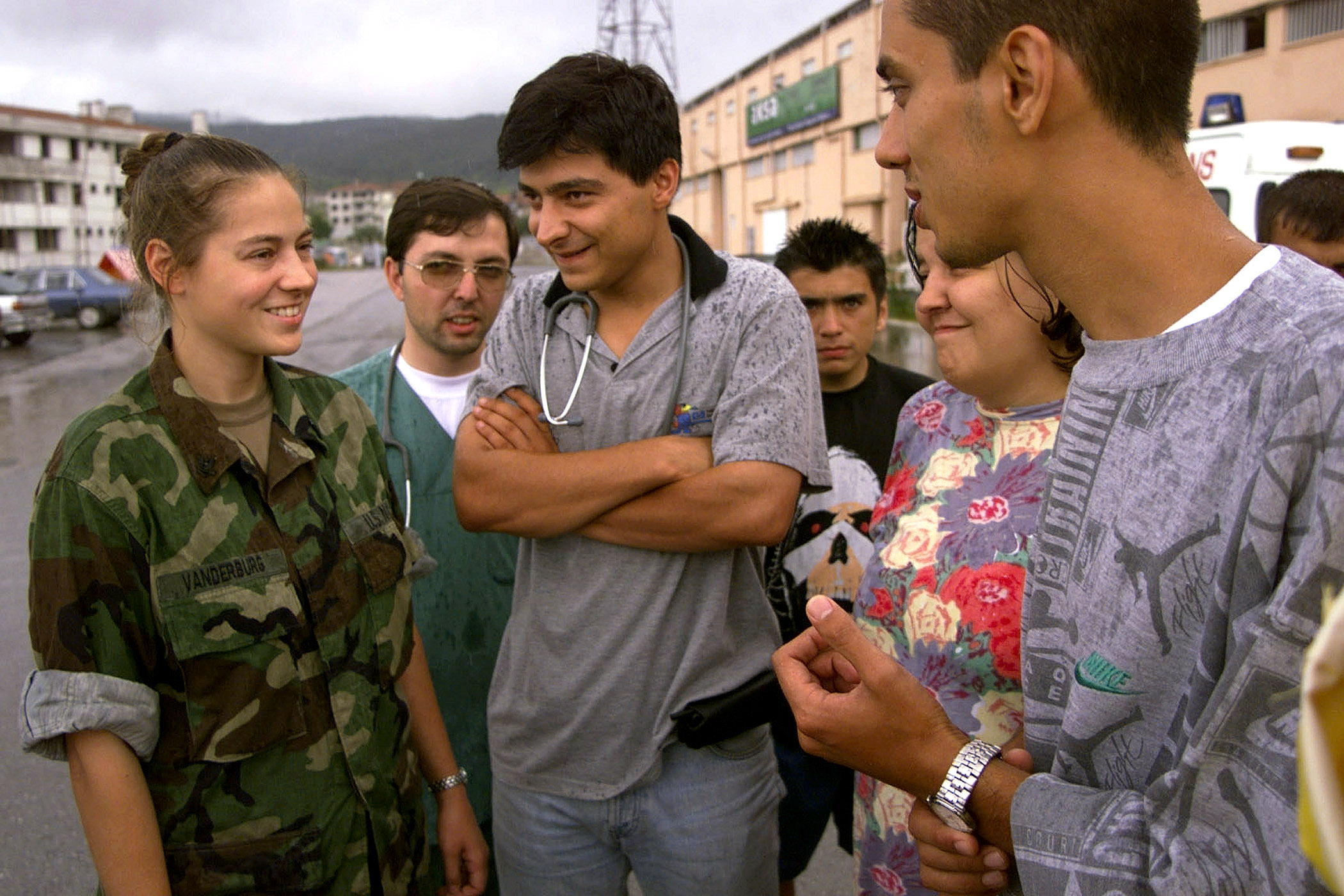
- A U.S. Navy sailor with earthquake survivors in Izmit, Turkey, August 1999
- Location: Kocaeli Province, Turkey
- Planned: August 1999
- Planned by: U.S. European Command
- Objective: Provide humanitarian disaster relief to affected earthquake survivors
- Date: August 29, 1999 – September 11, 1999
- Executed by: U.S. European Command; U.S. Agency for International Development; United States Marine Corps; 26th Marine Expeditionary Unit; United States Navy; USS Kearsarge amphibious ready group

Operation Avid Response is the name of U.S. humanitarian relief efforts to Turkey after the 1999 İzmit earthquake that struck Western Turkey on August 17, 1999. The earthquake, measuring 7.4 on the Richter scale, centered near Izmit, approximately 65 miles east of Istanbul, left an estimated 600,000 people homeless and damaged over 54,000 buildings, with up to 35,000 needing demolition. The mission concluded September 11, 1999.

== Background ==
Beginning on August 29, U.S. European Command (EUCOM) facilitated three shipments of relief supplies and tents via ferry, with a combined capacity to shelter more than 100,000 people. Additionally, three U.S. Navy warships from the USS Kearsarge (LHD-3) amphibious ready group, accompanied by the 26th Marine Expeditionary Unit (MEU) comprising 2,100 Marines recently in Kosovo, were deployed to Izmit to provide humanitarian and medical assistance. Those who participated in the operation were awarded the Humanitarian Service Medal.

In response to Turkish government requests to the U.S. Air Force, Air National Guard firefighting planes were prepared for deployment to contain oil refinery fires, although Turkish firemen ultimately managed to bring the blazes under control before U.S. assistance was required.

== Organization ==
U.S. efforts were handled by federal government agencies such as EUCOM and the U.S. Agency for International Development (USAID). These relief efforts prioritized search and rescue operations followed by the provision of shelter, food, medical care, and essential services.

== See also ==
- Operation Shining Hope
