= Operation Shining Hope =

Joint Task Force (JTF) Shining Hope was the United States contribution to Operation Allied Harbor in 1999. The mission of JTF Shining Hope was to conduct foreign humanitarian assistance operations in support of US government agencies and non-governmental and international organizations engaged in providing humanitarian relief to Kosovar refugees in Albania and Macedonia. JTF Shining Hope was commanded by Major General William S. Hinton Jr., United States Air Force.

== Background ==
The United States continued to work closely with the United Nations High Commissioner for Refugees (UNHCR) and other relief organizations to ensure a comprehensive and adequate response to the humanitarian crisis caused by the ethnic cleansing and atrocities being conducted by Serb forces.

United States and other NATO military forces provided support for humanitarian operations in a variety of ways, to include air and surface transportation of relief supplies and equipment, camp preparation, shelter construction, security, and other tasks uniquely suited to military forces. The Department of Defense pledged over $25 million in humanitarian assistance, which, in addition to the above, also included food (humanitarian daily rations), shelter (tents), bedding, medical supplies, and vehicles. The 26th MEU participated in these efforts.

For the JTF's efforts, the unit was awarded the Joint Meritorious Unit (JMUA) in August 1999 by Hugh Shelton, the Chairman of the Joint Chiefs of Staff. Inclusive dates for the award are 3 April 1999 to 1 July 1999.

== See also ==
- Operation Avid Response
